

469001–469100 

|-bgcolor=#d6d6d6
| 469001 ||  || — || June 10, 2011 || Mount Lemmon || Mount Lemmon Survey || EOS || align=right | 2.2 km || 
|-id=002 bgcolor=#E9E9E9
| 469002 ||  || — || October 13, 2004 || Anderson Mesa || LONEOS || — || align=right | 2.0 km || 
|-id=003 bgcolor=#d6d6d6
| 469003 ||  || — || October 26, 2013 || Catalina || CSS || — || align=right | 3.2 km || 
|-id=004 bgcolor=#E9E9E9
| 469004 ||  || — || December 18, 2009 || Catalina || CSS || — || align=right | 2.1 km || 
|-id=005 bgcolor=#fefefe
| 469005 ||  || — || November 18, 2006 || Mount Lemmon || Mount Lemmon Survey || — || align=right data-sort-value="0.91" | 910 m || 
|-id=006 bgcolor=#E9E9E9
| 469006 ||  || — || February 7, 2002 || Socorro || LINEAR || — || align=right | 2.4 km || 
|-id=007 bgcolor=#d6d6d6
| 469007 ||  || — || November 20, 2009 || Kitt Peak || Spacewatch || — || align=right | 3.8 km || 
|-id=008 bgcolor=#fefefe
| 469008 ||  || — || June 11, 2005 || Kitt Peak || Spacewatch || — || align=right | 1.2 km || 
|-id=009 bgcolor=#E9E9E9
| 469009 ||  || — || January 13, 2011 || Catalina || CSS || MAR || align=right | 1.5 km || 
|-id=010 bgcolor=#E9E9E9
| 469010 ||  || — || July 30, 2008 || Catalina || CSS || — || align=right | 1.5 km || 
|-id=011 bgcolor=#d6d6d6
| 469011 ||  || — || November 24, 2008 || Kitt Peak || Spacewatch || EMA || align=right | 3.6 km || 
|-id=012 bgcolor=#d6d6d6
| 469012 ||  || — || October 7, 2007 || Mount Lemmon || Mount Lemmon Survey || — || align=right | 2.9 km || 
|-id=013 bgcolor=#d6d6d6
| 469013 ||  || — || October 25, 2008 || Kitt Peak || Spacewatch || — || align=right | 3.9 km || 
|-id=014 bgcolor=#d6d6d6
| 469014 ||  || — || November 16, 2003 || Kitt Peak || Spacewatch || — || align=right | 2.1 km || 
|-id=015 bgcolor=#E9E9E9
| 469015 ||  || — || March 28, 2011 || Mount Lemmon || Mount Lemmon Survey || — || align=right | 2.5 km || 
|-id=016 bgcolor=#fefefe
| 469016 ||  || — || November 20, 2000 || Socorro || LINEAR || — || align=right data-sort-value="0.85" | 850 m || 
|-id=017 bgcolor=#d6d6d6
| 469017 ||  || — || August 10, 2007 || Kitt Peak || Spacewatch || EOS || align=right | 1.8 km || 
|-id=018 bgcolor=#fefefe
| 469018 ||  || — || December 3, 2007 || Kitt Peak || Spacewatch || — || align=right data-sort-value="0.98" | 980 m || 
|-id=019 bgcolor=#d6d6d6
| 469019 ||  || — || September 13, 2007 || Mount Lemmon || Mount Lemmon Survey || — || align=right | 2.9 km || 
|-id=020 bgcolor=#d6d6d6
| 469020 ||  || — || November 7, 2008 || Mount Lemmon || Mount Lemmon Survey || — || align=right | 3.7 km || 
|-id=021 bgcolor=#fefefe
| 469021 ||  || — || October 12, 2010 || Mount Lemmon || Mount Lemmon Survey || — || align=right data-sort-value="0.68" | 680 m || 
|-id=022 bgcolor=#d6d6d6
| 469022 ||  || — || October 15, 2007 || Mount Lemmon || Mount Lemmon Survey || — || align=right | 3.4 km || 
|-id=023 bgcolor=#d6d6d6
| 469023 ||  || — || November 20, 2008 || Kitt Peak || Spacewatch || EOS || align=right | 1.7 km || 
|-id=024 bgcolor=#d6d6d6
| 469024 ||  || — || December 30, 2008 || Mount Lemmon || Mount Lemmon Survey || — || align=right | 3.1 km || 
|-id=025 bgcolor=#E9E9E9
| 469025 ||  || — || April 9, 2003 || Socorro || LINEAR || — || align=right | 1.5 km || 
|-id=026 bgcolor=#E9E9E9
| 469026 ||  || — || December 29, 2005 || Kitt Peak || Spacewatch || — || align=right | 1.5 km || 
|-id=027 bgcolor=#d6d6d6
| 469027 ||  || — || January 16, 2010 || WISE || WISE || — || align=right | 4.3 km || 
|-id=028 bgcolor=#fefefe
| 469028 ||  || — || March 1, 2004 || Kitt Peak || Spacewatch || V || align=right data-sort-value="0.83" | 830 m || 
|-id=029 bgcolor=#E9E9E9
| 469029 ||  || — || December 1, 2005 || Kitt Peak || Spacewatch || — || align=right | 1.5 km || 
|-id=030 bgcolor=#d6d6d6
| 469030 ||  || — || March 31, 2011 || Mount Lemmon || Mount Lemmon Survey || EOS || align=right | 1.6 km || 
|-id=031 bgcolor=#d6d6d6
| 469031 ||  || — || December 8, 2008 || Mount Lemmon || Mount Lemmon Survey || — || align=right | 4.4 km || 
|-id=032 bgcolor=#fefefe
| 469032 ||  || — || January 21, 1993 || Kitt Peak || Spacewatch || MAS || align=right data-sort-value="0.60" | 600 m || 
|-id=033 bgcolor=#d6d6d6
| 469033 ||  || — || November 6, 2008 || Kitt Peak || Spacewatch || — || align=right | 2.3 km || 
|-id=034 bgcolor=#fefefe
| 469034 ||  || — || January 11, 2008 || Kitt Peak || Spacewatch || — || align=right data-sort-value="0.82" | 820 m || 
|-id=035 bgcolor=#d6d6d6
| 469035 ||  || — || September 7, 2008 || Mount Lemmon || Mount Lemmon Survey || — || align=right | 2.3 km || 
|-id=036 bgcolor=#E9E9E9
| 469036 ||  || — || February 17, 2007 || Kitt Peak || Spacewatch || MAR || align=right | 1.0 km || 
|-id=037 bgcolor=#d6d6d6
| 469037 ||  || — || December 18, 2003 || Kitt Peak || Spacewatch || — || align=right | 2.2 km || 
|-id=038 bgcolor=#E9E9E9
| 469038 ||  || — || April 30, 2008 || Mount Lemmon || Mount Lemmon Survey || — || align=right | 2.8 km || 
|-id=039 bgcolor=#fefefe
| 469039 ||  || — || December 19, 2007 || Kitt Peak || Spacewatch || — || align=right data-sort-value="0.97" | 970 m || 
|-id=040 bgcolor=#E9E9E9
| 469040 ||  || — || February 26, 2007 || Mount Lemmon || Mount Lemmon Survey || — || align=right data-sort-value="0.97" | 970 m || 
|-id=041 bgcolor=#d6d6d6
| 469041 ||  || — || November 7, 2008 || Mount Lemmon || Mount Lemmon Survey || — || align=right | 2.6 km || 
|-id=042 bgcolor=#d6d6d6
| 469042 ||  || — || January 8, 2010 || Mount Lemmon || Mount Lemmon Survey || EOS || align=right | 2.1 km || 
|-id=043 bgcolor=#E9E9E9
| 469043 ||  || — || January 30, 2011 || Kitt Peak || Spacewatch || (5) || align=right data-sort-value="0.82" | 820 m || 
|-id=044 bgcolor=#E9E9E9
| 469044 ||  || — || January 10, 2007 || Mount Lemmon || Mount Lemmon Survey || EUN || align=right | 1.4 km || 
|-id=045 bgcolor=#d6d6d6
| 469045 ||  || — || April 17, 2005 || Kitt Peak || Spacewatch || — || align=right | 2.8 km || 
|-id=046 bgcolor=#FA8072
| 469046 ||  || — || September 27, 2003 || Anderson Mesa || LONEOS || — || align=right | 1.2 km || 
|-id=047 bgcolor=#E9E9E9
| 469047 ||  || — || April 4, 2003 || Kitt Peak || Spacewatch || — || align=right | 1.7 km || 
|-id=048 bgcolor=#fefefe
| 469048 ||  || — || October 3, 2003 || Kitt Peak || Spacewatch || — || align=right data-sort-value="0.61" | 610 m || 
|-id=049 bgcolor=#d6d6d6
| 469049 ||  || — || September 10, 2007 || Mount Lemmon || Mount Lemmon Survey || — || align=right | 3.1 km || 
|-id=050 bgcolor=#E9E9E9
| 469050 ||  || — || March 23, 2006 || Catalina || CSS || — || align=right | 2.4 km || 
|-id=051 bgcolor=#E9E9E9
| 469051 ||  || — || February 25, 2011 || Kitt Peak || Spacewatch || — || align=right | 2.1 km || 
|-id=052 bgcolor=#d6d6d6
| 469052 ||  || — || May 31, 2010 || WISE || WISE || — || align=right | 3.5 km || 
|-id=053 bgcolor=#E9E9E9
| 469053 ||  || — || May 25, 2003 || Kitt Peak || Spacewatch || — || align=right | 3.3 km || 
|-id=054 bgcolor=#E9E9E9
| 469054 ||  || — || October 8, 2008 || Mount Lemmon || Mount Lemmon Survey || — || align=right | 2.1 km || 
|-id=055 bgcolor=#E9E9E9
| 469055 ||  || — || April 1, 2011 || Kitt Peak || Spacewatch || HOF || align=right | 2.7 km || 
|-id=056 bgcolor=#E9E9E9
| 469056 ||  || — || November 18, 2009 || Kitt Peak || Spacewatch || — || align=right | 1.5 km || 
|-id=057 bgcolor=#d6d6d6
| 469057 ||  || — || October 11, 2007 || Kitt Peak || Spacewatch || — || align=right | 2.8 km || 
|-id=058 bgcolor=#E9E9E9
| 469058 ||  || — || May 22, 2003 || Kitt Peak || Spacewatch || — || align=right | 1.6 km || 
|-id=059 bgcolor=#E9E9E9
| 469059 ||  || — || February 5, 2010 || WISE || WISE || — || align=right | 2.4 km || 
|-id=060 bgcolor=#fefefe
| 469060 ||  || — || January 16, 2011 || Mount Lemmon || Mount Lemmon Survey || — || align=right data-sort-value="0.84" | 840 m || 
|-id=061 bgcolor=#d6d6d6
| 469061 ||  || — || March 18, 2004 || Socorro || LINEAR || LIX || align=right | 4.2 km || 
|-id=062 bgcolor=#fefefe
| 469062 ||  || — || December 18, 2007 || Mount Lemmon || Mount Lemmon Survey || — || align=right data-sort-value="0.73" | 730 m || 
|-id=063 bgcolor=#E9E9E9
| 469063 ||  || — || January 21, 2006 || Kitt Peak || Spacewatch || DOR || align=right | 2.3 km || 
|-id=064 bgcolor=#d6d6d6
| 469064 ||  || — || May 16, 2010 || WISE || WISE || — || align=right | 2.9 km || 
|-id=065 bgcolor=#E9E9E9
| 469065 ||  || — || May 1, 2012 || Mount Lemmon || Mount Lemmon Survey || (5) || align=right data-sort-value="0.83" | 830 m || 
|-id=066 bgcolor=#d6d6d6
| 469066 ||  || — || April 10, 2010 || Kitt Peak || Spacewatch || — || align=right | 2.5 km || 
|-id=067 bgcolor=#d6d6d6
| 469067 ||  || — || March 14, 2010 || Mount Lemmon || Mount Lemmon Survey || — || align=right | 2.5 km || 
|-id=068 bgcolor=#E9E9E9
| 469068 ||  || — || August 30, 2005 || Kitt Peak || Spacewatch || — || align=right data-sort-value="0.90" | 900 m || 
|-id=069 bgcolor=#E9E9E9
| 469069 ||  || — || December 10, 2010 || Mount Lemmon || Mount Lemmon Survey || — || align=right | 1.1 km || 
|-id=070 bgcolor=#d6d6d6
| 469070 ||  || — || September 30, 2003 || Kitt Peak || Spacewatch || — || align=right | 2.6 km || 
|-id=071 bgcolor=#d6d6d6
| 469071 ||  || — || December 31, 2008 || Mount Lemmon || Mount Lemmon Survey || EOS || align=right | 1.8 km || 
|-id=072 bgcolor=#fefefe
| 469072 ||  || — || October 31, 2006 || Mount Lemmon || Mount Lemmon Survey || — || align=right | 1.1 km || 
|-id=073 bgcolor=#fefefe
| 469073 ||  || — || October 7, 2010 || Socorro || LINEAR || — || align=right data-sort-value="0.68" | 680 m || 
|-id=074 bgcolor=#fefefe
| 469074 ||  || — || September 18, 2003 || Kitt Peak || Spacewatch || — || align=right data-sort-value="0.88" | 880 m || 
|-id=075 bgcolor=#E9E9E9
| 469075 ||  || — || September 23, 2008 || Mount Lemmon || Mount Lemmon Survey || AGN || align=right | 1.2 km || 
|-id=076 bgcolor=#E9E9E9
| 469076 ||  || — || April 25, 2007 || Mount Lemmon || Mount Lemmon Survey || — || align=right | 1.3 km || 
|-id=077 bgcolor=#d6d6d6
| 469077 ||  || — || January 12, 2010 || WISE || WISE || — || align=right | 3.2 km || 
|-id=078 bgcolor=#d6d6d6
| 469078 ||  || — || January 21, 2004 || Socorro || LINEAR || EMA || align=right | 4.3 km || 
|-id=079 bgcolor=#E9E9E9
| 469079 ||  || — || May 11, 2003 || Kitt Peak || Spacewatch || — || align=right | 1.8 km || 
|-id=080 bgcolor=#fefefe
| 469080 ||  || — || January 29, 2011 || Mount Lemmon || Mount Lemmon Survey || — || align=right data-sort-value="0.95" | 950 m || 
|-id=081 bgcolor=#fefefe
| 469081 ||  || — || April 11, 2005 || Kitt Peak || Spacewatch || — || align=right data-sort-value="0.79" | 790 m || 
|-id=082 bgcolor=#E9E9E9
| 469082 ||  || — || February 4, 2006 || Kitt Peak || Spacewatch || PAD || align=right | 1.4 km || 
|-id=083 bgcolor=#E9E9E9
| 469083 ||  || — || October 4, 2004 || Kitt Peak || Spacewatch || EUN || align=right | 1.4 km || 
|-id=084 bgcolor=#d6d6d6
| 469084 ||  || — || March 12, 2011 || Mount Lemmon || Mount Lemmon Survey || — || align=right | 2.1 km || 
|-id=085 bgcolor=#d6d6d6
| 469085 ||  || — || January 26, 2010 || WISE || WISE || — || align=right | 2.5 km || 
|-id=086 bgcolor=#d6d6d6
| 469086 ||  || — || December 4, 2008 || Mount Lemmon || Mount Lemmon Survey || EOS || align=right | 2.0 km || 
|-id=087 bgcolor=#E9E9E9
| 469087 ||  || — || November 9, 2013 || Mount Lemmon || Mount Lemmon Survey || — || align=right | 2.8 km || 
|-id=088 bgcolor=#E9E9E9
| 469088 ||  || — || April 22, 1998 || Kitt Peak || Spacewatch || NEM || align=right | 2.8 km || 
|-id=089 bgcolor=#d6d6d6
| 469089 ||  || — || June 11, 2010 || WISE || WISE || — || align=right | 3.7 km || 
|-id=090 bgcolor=#d6d6d6
| 469090 ||  || — || January 26, 2000 || Kitt Peak || Spacewatch || — || align=right | 2.5 km || 
|-id=091 bgcolor=#d6d6d6
| 469091 ||  || — || December 31, 2008 || Kitt Peak || Spacewatch || — || align=right | 2.9 km || 
|-id=092 bgcolor=#d6d6d6
| 469092 ||  || — || January 7, 2010 || Mount Lemmon || Mount Lemmon Survey || — || align=right | 2.0 km || 
|-id=093 bgcolor=#d6d6d6
| 469093 ||  || — || March 20, 2010 || Mount Lemmon || Mount Lemmon Survey || — || align=right | 2.5 km || 
|-id=094 bgcolor=#E9E9E9
| 469094 ||  || — || January 8, 2006 || Mount Lemmon || Mount Lemmon Survey || — || align=right | 2.3 km || 
|-id=095 bgcolor=#fefefe
| 469095 ||  || — || November 17, 2007 || Catalina || CSS || — || align=right data-sort-value="0.67" | 670 m || 
|-id=096 bgcolor=#fefefe
| 469096 ||  || — || December 26, 1995 || Kitt Peak || Spacewatch || — || align=right | 1.2 km || 
|-id=097 bgcolor=#E9E9E9
| 469097 ||  || — || January 27, 2011 || Kitt Peak || Spacewatch || (5) || align=right data-sort-value="0.88" | 880 m || 
|-id=098 bgcolor=#d6d6d6
| 469098 ||  || — || October 15, 2007 || Mount Lemmon || Mount Lemmon Survey || — || align=right | 2.7 km || 
|-id=099 bgcolor=#E9E9E9
| 469099 ||  || — || October 22, 1995 || Kitt Peak || Spacewatch || — || align=right | 1.8 km || 
|-id=100 bgcolor=#d6d6d6
| 469100 ||  || — || September 14, 2007 || Mount Lemmon || Mount Lemmon Survey || EOS || align=right | 1.8 km || 
|}

469101–469200 

|-bgcolor=#fefefe
| 469101 ||  || — || June 11, 2004 || Kitt Peak || Spacewatch || NYS || align=right data-sort-value="0.80" | 800 m || 
|-id=102 bgcolor=#d6d6d6
| 469102 ||  || — || February 7, 1999 || Kitt Peak || Spacewatch || EOS || align=right | 2.3 km || 
|-id=103 bgcolor=#d6d6d6
| 469103 ||  || — || April 7, 2010 || Kitt Peak || Spacewatch || — || align=right | 3.7 km || 
|-id=104 bgcolor=#d6d6d6
| 469104 ||  || — || March 16, 2005 || Catalina || CSS || — || align=right | 3.1 km || 
|-id=105 bgcolor=#d6d6d6
| 469105 ||  || — || August 28, 2006 || Catalina || CSS || TIR || align=right | 2.9 km || 
|-id=106 bgcolor=#d6d6d6
| 469106 ||  || — || October 16, 2003 || Kitt Peak || Spacewatch || — || align=right | 2.5 km || 
|-id=107 bgcolor=#E9E9E9
| 469107 ||  || — || March 26, 2007 || Mount Lemmon || Mount Lemmon Survey || — || align=right | 1.3 km || 
|-id=108 bgcolor=#E9E9E9
| 469108 ||  || — || January 21, 2002 || Kitt Peak || Spacewatch || — || align=right | 1.4 km || 
|-id=109 bgcolor=#d6d6d6
| 469109 ||  || — || June 3, 2011 || Mount Lemmon || Mount Lemmon Survey || EOS || align=right | 1.8 km || 
|-id=110 bgcolor=#fefefe
| 469110 ||  || — || June 11, 2004 || Kitt Peak || Spacewatch || — || align=right data-sort-value="0.95" | 950 m || 
|-id=111 bgcolor=#E9E9E9
| 469111 ||  || — || September 23, 2008 || Mount Lemmon || Mount Lemmon Survey || — || align=right | 2.1 km || 
|-id=112 bgcolor=#d6d6d6
| 469112 ||  || — || February 9, 2005 || Kitt Peak || Spacewatch || KOR || align=right | 1.8 km || 
|-id=113 bgcolor=#d6d6d6
| 469113 ||  || — || April 4, 2005 || Catalina || CSS || EOS || align=right | 2.3 km || 
|-id=114 bgcolor=#fefefe
| 469114 ||  || — || March 16, 2005 || Catalina || CSS || — || align=right data-sort-value="0.82" | 820 m || 
|-id=115 bgcolor=#d6d6d6
| 469115 ||  || — || May 13, 2005 || Kitt Peak || Spacewatch || EOS || align=right | 2.5 km || 
|-id=116 bgcolor=#d6d6d6
| 469116 ||  || — || April 14, 2005 || Kitt Peak || Spacewatch || — || align=right | 2.6 km || 
|-id=117 bgcolor=#fefefe
| 469117 ||  || — || November 1, 2006 || Mount Lemmon || Mount Lemmon Survey || — || align=right | 1.1 km || 
|-id=118 bgcolor=#E9E9E9
| 469118 ||  || — || November 10, 2009 || Kitt Peak || Spacewatch || — || align=right | 1.2 km || 
|-id=119 bgcolor=#d6d6d6
| 469119 ||  || — || November 7, 2008 || Mount Lemmon || Mount Lemmon Survey || — || align=right | 2.9 km || 
|-id=120 bgcolor=#d6d6d6
| 469120 ||  || — || March 13, 2005 || Catalina || CSS || EOS || align=right | 2.2 km || 
|-id=121 bgcolor=#d6d6d6
| 469121 ||  || — || December 5, 2002 || Kitt Peak || Spacewatch || EOS || align=right | 1.7 km || 
|-id=122 bgcolor=#d6d6d6
| 469122 ||  || — || March 19, 2004 || Socorro || LINEAR || — || align=right | 3.3 km || 
|-id=123 bgcolor=#d6d6d6
| 469123 ||  || — || December 30, 2008 || Mount Lemmon || Mount Lemmon Survey || — || align=right | 3.9 km || 
|-id=124 bgcolor=#d6d6d6
| 469124 ||  || — || May 22, 2006 || Kitt Peak || Spacewatch || — || align=right | 3.4 km || 
|-id=125 bgcolor=#E9E9E9
| 469125 ||  || — || September 24, 2008 || Mount Lemmon || Mount Lemmon Survey || — || align=right | 2.7 km || 
|-id=126 bgcolor=#E9E9E9
| 469126 ||  || — || October 22, 2008 || Mount Lemmon || Mount Lemmon Survey || — || align=right | 2.2 km || 
|-id=127 bgcolor=#E9E9E9
| 469127 ||  || — || December 11, 2004 || Kitt Peak || Spacewatch || — || align=right | 2.0 km || 
|-id=128 bgcolor=#E9E9E9
| 469128 ||  || — || October 15, 2009 || Mount Lemmon || Mount Lemmon Survey || — || align=right | 2.1 km || 
|-id=129 bgcolor=#fefefe
| 469129 ||  || — || January 18, 2008 || Kitt Peak || Spacewatch || — || align=right data-sort-value="0.89" | 890 m || 
|-id=130 bgcolor=#d6d6d6
| 469130 ||  || — || March 13, 2005 || Kitt Peak || Spacewatch || — || align=right | 3.1 km || 
|-id=131 bgcolor=#d6d6d6
| 469131 ||  || — || November 19, 2008 || Catalina || CSS || — || align=right | 4.9 km || 
|-id=132 bgcolor=#E9E9E9
| 469132 ||  || — || September 18, 2003 || Anderson Mesa || LONEOS || HOF || align=right | 3.0 km || 
|-id=133 bgcolor=#E9E9E9
| 469133 ||  || — || February 6, 2006 || Mount Lemmon || Mount Lemmon Survey || ADE || align=right | 2.2 km || 
|-id=134 bgcolor=#d6d6d6
| 469134 ||  || — || February 17, 2004 || Kitt Peak || Spacewatch || EOS || align=right | 2.7 km || 
|-id=135 bgcolor=#d6d6d6
| 469135 ||  || — || June 5, 2000 || Kitt Peak || Spacewatch || — || align=right | 4.1 km || 
|-id=136 bgcolor=#d6d6d6
| 469136 ||  || — || April 8, 2010 || Kitt Peak || Spacewatch || — || align=right | 3.6 km || 
|-id=137 bgcolor=#d6d6d6
| 469137 ||  || — || October 2, 2006 || Mount Lemmon || Mount Lemmon Survey || VER || align=right | 2.8 km || 
|-id=138 bgcolor=#d6d6d6
| 469138 ||  || — || December 31, 2008 || Kitt Peak || Spacewatch || EOS || align=right | 1.8 km || 
|-id=139 bgcolor=#E9E9E9
| 469139 ||  || — || April 18, 2006 || Anderson Mesa || LONEOS || DOR || align=right | 2.7 km || 
|-id=140 bgcolor=#d6d6d6
| 469140 ||  || — || February 16, 2010 || Kitt Peak || Spacewatch || — || align=right | 3.3 km || 
|-id=141 bgcolor=#E9E9E9
| 469141 ||  || — || January 8, 2010 || Kitt Peak || Spacewatch || — || align=right | 2.5 km || 
|-id=142 bgcolor=#d6d6d6
| 469142 ||  || — || January 13, 2010 || WISE || WISE || LIX || align=right | 3.4 km || 
|-id=143 bgcolor=#d6d6d6
| 469143 ||  || — || October 9, 2007 || Mount Lemmon || Mount Lemmon Survey || — || align=right | 2.7 km || 
|-id=144 bgcolor=#d6d6d6
| 469144 ||  || — || September 4, 2000 || Anderson Mesa || LONEOS || — || align=right | 4.1 km || 
|-id=145 bgcolor=#E9E9E9
| 469145 ||  || — || January 31, 2006 || Kitt Peak || Spacewatch || — || align=right | 2.2 km || 
|-id=146 bgcolor=#E9E9E9
| 469146 ||  || — || October 17, 2003 || Kitt Peak || Spacewatch || — || align=right | 2.2 km || 
|-id=147 bgcolor=#d6d6d6
| 469147 ||  || — || October 20, 2007 || Mount Lemmon || Mount Lemmon Survey || EOS || align=right | 2.1 km || 
|-id=148 bgcolor=#E9E9E9
| 469148 ||  || — || May 9, 2006 || Mount Lemmon || Mount Lemmon Survey || — || align=right | 2.7 km || 
|-id=149 bgcolor=#d6d6d6
| 469149 ||  || — || November 17, 2007 || Kitt Peak || Spacewatch || — || align=right | 3.3 km || 
|-id=150 bgcolor=#d6d6d6
| 469150 ||  || — || October 2, 2006 || Mount Lemmon || Mount Lemmon Survey || — || align=right | 3.9 km || 
|-id=151 bgcolor=#d6d6d6
| 469151 ||  || — || February 13, 2010 || WISE || WISE || — || align=right | 2.6 km || 
|-id=152 bgcolor=#d6d6d6
| 469152 ||  || — || November 21, 2003 || Kitt Peak || Spacewatch || — || align=right | 2.3 km || 
|-id=153 bgcolor=#fefefe
| 469153 ||  || — || September 23, 1997 || Kitt Peak || Spacewatch || NYS || align=right data-sort-value="0.69" | 690 m || 
|-id=154 bgcolor=#d6d6d6
| 469154 ||  || — || October 2, 2006 || Mount Lemmon || Mount Lemmon Survey || — || align=right | 2.8 km || 
|-id=155 bgcolor=#d6d6d6
| 469155 ||  || — || October 18, 2006 || Kitt Peak || Spacewatch || — || align=right | 3.0 km || 
|-id=156 bgcolor=#d6d6d6
| 469156 ||  || — || February 20, 2009 || Kitt Peak || Spacewatch || — || align=right | 2.7 km || 
|-id=157 bgcolor=#E9E9E9
| 469157 ||  || — || April 28, 2011 || Kitt Peak || Spacewatch || — || align=right | 1.7 km || 
|-id=158 bgcolor=#d6d6d6
| 469158 ||  || — || February 1, 2009 || Mount Lemmon || Mount Lemmon Survey || — || align=right | 2.8 km || 
|-id=159 bgcolor=#fefefe
| 469159 ||  || — || June 12, 2008 || Kitt Peak || Spacewatch || — || align=right | 1.2 km || 
|-id=160 bgcolor=#d6d6d6
| 469160 ||  || — || December 16, 2007 || Kitt Peak || Spacewatch || — || align=right | 3.1 km || 
|-id=161 bgcolor=#d6d6d6
| 469161 ||  || — || November 5, 2007 || Mount Lemmon || Mount Lemmon Survey || EOS || align=right | 2.0 km || 
|-id=162 bgcolor=#d6d6d6
| 469162 ||  || — || March 21, 2009 || Kitt Peak || Spacewatch || — || align=right | 4.1 km || 
|-id=163 bgcolor=#C2FFFF
| 469163 ||  || — || December 2, 2010 || Mount Lemmon || Mount Lemmon Survey || L4 || align=right | 6.5 km || 
|-id=164 bgcolor=#d6d6d6
| 469164 ||  || — || March 3, 2005 || Kitt Peak || Spacewatch || — || align=right | 2.8 km || 
|-id=165 bgcolor=#d6d6d6
| 469165 ||  || — || May 19, 2004 || Campo Imperatore || CINEOS || — || align=right | 3.3 km || 
|-id=166 bgcolor=#d6d6d6
| 469166 ||  || — || March 25, 2009 || Mount Lemmon || Mount Lemmon Survey || — || align=right | 3.3 km || 
|-id=167 bgcolor=#d6d6d6
| 469167 ||  || — || August 29, 2006 || Catalina || CSS || EOS || align=right | 2.4 km || 
|-id=168 bgcolor=#d6d6d6
| 469168 ||  || — || September 23, 2011 || Kitt Peak || Spacewatch || 7:4 || align=right | 3.6 km || 
|-id=169 bgcolor=#d6d6d6
| 469169 ||  || — || April 18, 2009 || Mount Lemmon || Mount Lemmon Survey || — || align=right | 2.9 km || 
|-id=170 bgcolor=#d6d6d6
| 469170 ||  || — || September 29, 2008 || Mount Lemmon || Mount Lemmon Survey || 3:2 || align=right | 5.6 km || 
|-id=171 bgcolor=#fefefe
| 469171 ||  || — || December 1, 2003 || Kitt Peak || Spacewatch || V || align=right data-sort-value="0.70" | 700 m || 
|-id=172 bgcolor=#d6d6d6
| 469172 ||  || — || November 17, 2009 || Mount Lemmon || Mount Lemmon Survey || — || align=right | 2.2 km || 
|-id=173 bgcolor=#d6d6d6
| 469173 ||  || — || April 21, 2006 || Kitt Peak || Spacewatch || — || align=right | 3.0 km || 
|-id=174 bgcolor=#E9E9E9
| 469174 ||  || — || May 22, 2003 || Kitt Peak || Spacewatch || — || align=right | 1.3 km || 
|-id=175 bgcolor=#E9E9E9
| 469175 ||  || — || June 2, 2008 || Kitt Peak || Spacewatch || — || align=right | 1.3 km || 
|-id=176 bgcolor=#E9E9E9
| 469176 ||  || — || January 27, 2007 || Kitt Peak || Spacewatch || — || align=right | 1.6 km || 
|-id=177 bgcolor=#d6d6d6
| 469177 ||  || — || December 29, 2008 || Kitt Peak || Spacewatch || — || align=right | 3.1 km || 
|-id=178 bgcolor=#fefefe
| 469178 ||  || — || January 28, 2007 || Mount Lemmon || Mount Lemmon Survey || — || align=right data-sort-value="0.54" | 540 m || 
|-id=179 bgcolor=#fefefe
| 469179 ||  || — || April 2, 2006 || Kitt Peak || Spacewatch || — || align=right data-sort-value="0.67" | 670 m || 
|-id=180 bgcolor=#d6d6d6
| 469180 ||  || — || January 19, 2005 || Kitt Peak || Spacewatch || — || align=right | 2.4 km || 
|-id=181 bgcolor=#E9E9E9
| 469181 ||  || — || July 28, 2009 || Kitt Peak || Spacewatch || — || align=right | 1.5 km || 
|-id=182 bgcolor=#d6d6d6
| 469182 ||  || — || March 16, 2005 || Catalina || CSS || Tj (2.96) || align=right | 2.8 km || 
|-id=183 bgcolor=#fefefe
| 469183 ||  || — || November 6, 2010 || Mount Lemmon || Mount Lemmon Survey || — || align=right | 1.1 km || 
|-id=184 bgcolor=#E9E9E9
| 469184 ||  || — || November 3, 2005 || Kitt Peak || Spacewatch || — || align=right | 1.8 km || 
|-id=185 bgcolor=#E9E9E9
| 469185 ||  || — || February 17, 2007 || Mount Lemmon || Mount Lemmon Survey || — || align=right | 1.3 km || 
|-id=186 bgcolor=#d6d6d6
| 469186 ||  || — || June 10, 2010 || WISE || WISE || — || align=right | 3.1 km || 
|-id=187 bgcolor=#E9E9E9
| 469187 ||  || — || March 27, 2012 || Kitt Peak || Spacewatch || — || align=right | 1.1 km || 
|-id=188 bgcolor=#fefefe
| 469188 ||  || — || March 21, 2002 || Kitt Peak || Spacewatch || — || align=right data-sort-value="0.66" | 660 m || 
|-id=189 bgcolor=#E9E9E9
| 469189 ||  || — || April 24, 2012 || Mount Lemmon || Mount Lemmon Survey || — || align=right | 1.1 km || 
|-id=190 bgcolor=#E9E9E9
| 469190 ||  || — || October 27, 2005 || Kitt Peak || Spacewatch || — || align=right | 1.8 km || 
|-id=191 bgcolor=#FA8072
| 469191 ||  || — || September 12, 2004 || Kitt Peak || Spacewatch || — || align=right data-sort-value="0.74" | 740 m || 
|-id=192 bgcolor=#E9E9E9
| 469192 ||  || — || September 7, 2008 || Mount Lemmon || Mount Lemmon Survey || — || align=right | 1.7 km || 
|-id=193 bgcolor=#d6d6d6
| 469193 ||  || — || April 24, 2006 || Anderson Mesa || LONEOS || — || align=right | 3.5 km || 
|-id=194 bgcolor=#E9E9E9
| 469194 ||  || — || September 8, 2004 || Socorro || LINEAR || — || align=right | 1.1 km || 
|-id=195 bgcolor=#d6d6d6
| 469195 ||  || — || June 16, 2010 || WISE || WISE || — || align=right | 3.9 km || 
|-id=196 bgcolor=#d6d6d6
| 469196 ||  || — || May 13, 2005 || Kitt Peak || Spacewatch || — || align=right | 2.3 km || 
|-id=197 bgcolor=#fefefe
| 469197 ||  || — || January 23, 2006 || Kitt Peak || Spacewatch || — || align=right data-sort-value="0.72" | 720 m || 
|-id=198 bgcolor=#E9E9E9
| 469198 ||  || — || November 25, 2005 || Mount Lemmon || Mount Lemmon Survey || — || align=right | 2.5 km || 
|-id=199 bgcolor=#E9E9E9
| 469199 ||  || — || June 4, 1995 || Kitt Peak || Spacewatch || — || align=right | 1.4 km || 
|-id=200 bgcolor=#d6d6d6
| 469200 ||  || — || June 3, 2010 || WISE || WISE || — || align=right | 4.4 km || 
|}

469201–469300 

|-bgcolor=#fefefe
| 469201 ||  || — || October 14, 1998 || Kitt Peak || Spacewatch || — || align=right | 1.0 km || 
|-id=202 bgcolor=#d6d6d6
| 469202 ||  || — || April 8, 2010 || Mount Lemmon || Mount Lemmon Survey || — || align=right | 3.4 km || 
|-id=203 bgcolor=#E9E9E9
| 469203 ||  || — || March 26, 2007 || Kitt Peak || Spacewatch || MAR || align=right data-sort-value="0.93" | 930 m || 
|-id=204 bgcolor=#E9E9E9
| 469204 ||  || — || March 23, 2003 || Kitt Peak || Spacewatch || — || align=right | 1.6 km || 
|-id=205 bgcolor=#E9E9E9
| 469205 ||  || — || September 18, 2003 || Anderson Mesa || LONEOS || — || align=right | 3.1 km || 
|-id=206 bgcolor=#E9E9E9
| 469206 ||  || — || May 12, 2012 || Catalina || CSS || — || align=right | 1.2 km || 
|-id=207 bgcolor=#fefefe
| 469207 ||  || — || January 21, 2002 || Kitt Peak || Spacewatch || — || align=right data-sort-value="0.68" | 680 m || 
|-id=208 bgcolor=#d6d6d6
| 469208 ||  || — || October 6, 2007 || Kitt Peak || Spacewatch || — || align=right | 2.3 km || 
|-id=209 bgcolor=#d6d6d6
| 469209 ||  || — || October 7, 2007 || Mount Lemmon || Mount Lemmon Survey || — || align=right | 3.2 km || 
|-id=210 bgcolor=#d6d6d6
| 469210 ||  || — || January 8, 2010 || Mount Lemmon || Mount Lemmon Survey || — || align=right | 3.9 km || 
|-id=211 bgcolor=#d6d6d6
| 469211 ||  || — || March 14, 2005 || Catalina || CSS || — || align=right | 2.2 km || 
|-id=212 bgcolor=#d6d6d6
| 469212 ||  || — || October 12, 2007 || Catalina || CSS || — || align=right | 3.5 km || 
|-id=213 bgcolor=#E9E9E9
| 469213 ||  || — || April 21, 1999 || Kitt Peak || Spacewatch || — || align=right | 1.7 km || 
|-id=214 bgcolor=#fefefe
| 469214 ||  || — || August 15, 2009 || Kitt Peak || Spacewatch || — || align=right data-sort-value="0.77" | 770 m || 
|-id=215 bgcolor=#d6d6d6
| 469215 ||  || — || October 28, 2013 || Kitt Peak || Spacewatch || — || align=right | 2.9 km || 
|-id=216 bgcolor=#fefefe
| 469216 ||  || — || January 18, 2008 || Mount Lemmon || Mount Lemmon Survey || — || align=right data-sort-value="0.87" | 870 m || 
|-id=217 bgcolor=#E9E9E9
| 469217 ||  || — || November 21, 2006 || Mount Lemmon || Mount Lemmon Survey || — || align=right | 1.3 km || 
|-id=218 bgcolor=#d6d6d6
| 469218 ||  || — || September 27, 2008 || Mount Lemmon || Mount Lemmon Survey || — || align=right | 3.1 km || 
|-id=219 bgcolor=#FFC2E0
| 469219 Kamoʻoalewa ||  ||  || April 27, 2016 || Haleakala || Pan-STARRS || APOfast || align=right data-sort-value="0.048" | 48 m || 
|-id=220 bgcolor=#d6d6d6
| 469220 ||  || — || October 19, 2006 || Kitt Peak || Spacewatch || Tj (2.99) || align=right | 3.7 km || 
|-id=221 bgcolor=#E9E9E9
| 469221 ||  || — || January 27, 2007 || Kitt Peak || Spacewatch || — || align=right data-sort-value="0.98" | 980 m || 
|-id=222 bgcolor=#d6d6d6
| 469222 ||  || — || December 1, 2008 || Catalina || CSS || — || align=right | 3.2 km || 
|-id=223 bgcolor=#E9E9E9
| 469223 ||  || — || January 12, 2011 || Mount Lemmon || Mount Lemmon Survey || — || align=right | 1.1 km || 
|-id=224 bgcolor=#E9E9E9
| 469224 ||  || — || February 4, 2006 || Kitt Peak || Spacewatch || — || align=right | 2.0 km || 
|-id=225 bgcolor=#fefefe
| 469225 ||  || — || May 21, 2006 || Kitt Peak || Spacewatch || — || align=right data-sort-value="0.81" | 810 m || 
|-id=226 bgcolor=#d6d6d6
| 469226 ||  || — || April 14, 2010 || WISE || WISE || — || align=right | 2.5 km || 
|-id=227 bgcolor=#d6d6d6
| 469227 ||  || — || November 3, 2008 || Kitt Peak || Spacewatch || — || align=right | 3.3 km || 
|-id=228 bgcolor=#d6d6d6
| 469228 ||  || — || April 13, 2010 || WISE || WISE || — || align=right | 4.8 km || 
|-id=229 bgcolor=#fefefe
| 469229 ||  || — || March 2, 2009 || Mount Lemmon || Mount Lemmon Survey || — || align=right data-sort-value="0.64" | 640 m || 
|-id=230 bgcolor=#d6d6d6
| 469230 ||  || — || March 26, 2006 || Kitt Peak || Spacewatch || — || align=right | 3.9 km || 
|-id=231 bgcolor=#E9E9E9
| 469231 ||  || — || October 11, 2005 || Kitt Peak || Spacewatch || — || align=right | 1.4 km || 
|-id=232 bgcolor=#fefefe
| 469232 ||  || — || August 19, 2001 || Socorro || LINEAR || — || align=right data-sort-value="0.86" | 860 m || 
|-id=233 bgcolor=#E9E9E9
| 469233 ||  || — || January 3, 2011 || Mount Lemmon || Mount Lemmon Survey || — || align=right | 1.3 km || 
|-id=234 bgcolor=#FA8072
| 469234 ||  || — || April 21, 2009 || Mount Lemmon || Mount Lemmon Survey || — || align=right data-sort-value="0.83" | 830 m || 
|-id=235 bgcolor=#E9E9E9
| 469235 ||  || — || December 1, 2005 || Catalina || CSS || EUN || align=right | 1.4 km || 
|-id=236 bgcolor=#fefefe
| 469236 ||  || — || December 31, 2007 || Mount Lemmon || Mount Lemmon Survey || — || align=right data-sort-value="0.84" | 840 m || 
|-id=237 bgcolor=#d6d6d6
| 469237 ||  || — || April 11, 2010 || Catalina || CSS || Tj (2.99) || align=right | 4.5 km || 
|-id=238 bgcolor=#E9E9E9
| 469238 ||  || — || January 15, 2007 || Catalina || CSS || — || align=right | 1.9 km || 
|-id=239 bgcolor=#E9E9E9
| 469239 ||  || — || November 10, 2004 || Kitt Peak || Spacewatch || — || align=right | 2.2 km || 
|-id=240 bgcolor=#d6d6d6
| 469240 ||  || — || April 11, 2011 || Mount Lemmon || Mount Lemmon Survey || — || align=right | 2.6 km || 
|-id=241 bgcolor=#d6d6d6
| 469241 ||  || — || October 11, 2007 || Catalina || CSS || — || align=right | 3.8 km || 
|-id=242 bgcolor=#fefefe
| 469242 ||  || — || October 10, 2010 || Mount Lemmon || Mount Lemmon Survey || — || align=right | 1.3 km || 
|-id=243 bgcolor=#fefefe
| 469243 ||  || — || February 4, 2006 || Kitt Peak || Spacewatch || — || align=right data-sort-value="0.64" | 640 m || 
|-id=244 bgcolor=#d6d6d6
| 469244 ||  || — || December 8, 2008 || Mount Lemmon || Mount Lemmon Survey || — || align=right | 4.3 km || 
|-id=245 bgcolor=#d6d6d6
| 469245 ||  || — || June 21, 2011 || Kitt Peak || Spacewatch || — || align=right | 3.7 km || 
|-id=246 bgcolor=#d6d6d6
| 469246 ||  || — || November 19, 2003 || Anderson Mesa || LONEOS || — || align=right | 3.0 km || 
|-id=247 bgcolor=#d6d6d6
| 469247 ||  || — || April 11, 2005 || Kitt Peak || Spacewatch || — || align=right | 3.6 km || 
|-id=248 bgcolor=#fefefe
| 469248 ||  || — || April 2, 2009 || Kitt Peak || Spacewatch || V || align=right data-sort-value="0.61" | 610 m || 
|-id=249 bgcolor=#E9E9E9
| 469249 ||  || — || March 28, 2012 || Mount Lemmon || Mount Lemmon Survey || — || align=right | 1.3 km || 
|-id=250 bgcolor=#E9E9E9
| 469250 ||  || — || May 8, 1999 || Catalina || CSS || — || align=right | 2.2 km || 
|-id=251 bgcolor=#E9E9E9
| 469251 ||  || — || October 9, 2008 || Catalina || CSS || — || align=right | 2.6 km || 
|-id=252 bgcolor=#E9E9E9
| 469252 ||  || — || November 18, 2009 || Mount Lemmon || Mount Lemmon Survey || — || align=right | 2.7 km || 
|-id=253 bgcolor=#fefefe
| 469253 ||  || — || November 15, 1998 || Kitt Peak || Spacewatch || — || align=right data-sort-value="0.97" | 970 m || 
|-id=254 bgcolor=#fefefe
| 469254 ||  || — || September 20, 2006 || Kitt Peak || Spacewatch || — || align=right data-sort-value="0.76" | 760 m || 
|-id=255 bgcolor=#E9E9E9
| 469255 ||  || — || May 2, 2003 || Kitt Peak || Spacewatch || — || align=right | 1.7 km || 
|-id=256 bgcolor=#fefefe
| 469256 ||  || — || March 28, 2009 || Mount Lemmon || Mount Lemmon Survey || — || align=right | 1.00 km || 
|-id=257 bgcolor=#fefefe
| 469257 ||  || — || December 9, 2004 || Kitt Peak || Spacewatch || — || align=right data-sort-value="0.93" | 930 m || 
|-id=258 bgcolor=#d6d6d6
| 469258 ||  || — || June 2, 2010 || WISE || WISE || — || align=right | 5.4 km || 
|-id=259 bgcolor=#E9E9E9
| 469259 ||  || — || March 27, 2011 || Mount Lemmon || Mount Lemmon Survey || — || align=right | 2.7 km || 
|-id=260 bgcolor=#fefefe
| 469260 ||  || — || November 24, 2006 || Mount Lemmon || Mount Lemmon Survey || — || align=right data-sort-value="0.89" | 890 m || 
|-id=261 bgcolor=#fefefe
| 469261 ||  || — || April 28, 2009 || Mount Lemmon || Mount Lemmon Survey || — || align=right data-sort-value="0.80" | 800 m || 
|-id=262 bgcolor=#E9E9E9
| 469262 ||  || — || September 27, 2008 || Catalina || CSS || — || align=right | 2.4 km || 
|-id=263 bgcolor=#E9E9E9
| 469263 ||  || — || June 2, 2003 || Kitt Peak || Spacewatch || — || align=right | 1.8 km || 
|-id=264 bgcolor=#d6d6d6
| 469264 ||  || — || November 30, 2008 || Mount Lemmon || Mount Lemmon Survey || EOS || align=right | 3.9 km || 
|-id=265 bgcolor=#E9E9E9
| 469265 ||  || — || November 6, 2005 || Mount Lemmon || Mount Lemmon Survey || EUN || align=right | 1.5 km || 
|-id=266 bgcolor=#E9E9E9
| 469266 ||  || — || October 18, 2009 || Mount Lemmon || Mount Lemmon Survey || EUN || align=right | 1.1 km || 
|-id=267 bgcolor=#fefefe
| 469267 ||  || — || December 30, 2011 || Kitt Peak || Spacewatch || — || align=right data-sort-value="0.71" | 710 m || 
|-id=268 bgcolor=#d6d6d6
| 469268 ||  || — || November 1, 2008 || Mount Lemmon || Mount Lemmon Survey || — || align=right | 3.9 km || 
|-id=269 bgcolor=#E9E9E9
| 469269 ||  || — || February 6, 2007 || Mount Lemmon || Mount Lemmon Survey || KON || align=right | 3.4 km || 
|-id=270 bgcolor=#fefefe
| 469270 ||  || — || April 25, 2003 || Kitt Peak || Spacewatch || — || align=right data-sort-value="0.71" | 710 m || 
|-id=271 bgcolor=#E9E9E9
| 469271 ||  || — || November 3, 2005 || Mount Lemmon || Mount Lemmon Survey || — || align=right | 1.2 km || 
|-id=272 bgcolor=#E9E9E9
| 469272 ||  || — || June 30, 2004 || Siding Spring || SSS || — || align=right | 1.6 km || 
|-id=273 bgcolor=#E9E9E9
| 469273 ||  || — || May 18, 1999 || Socorro || LINEAR || — || align=right | 2.4 km || 
|-id=274 bgcolor=#E9E9E9
| 469274 ||  || — || April 11, 2003 || Kitt Peak || Spacewatch || — || align=right | 1.8 km || 
|-id=275 bgcolor=#d6d6d6
| 469275 ||  || — || May 11, 2005 || Kitt Peak || Spacewatch || LIX || align=right | 4.1 km || 
|-id=276 bgcolor=#FA8072
| 469276 ||  || — || September 16, 1993 || Kitt Peak || Spacewatch || — || align=right data-sort-value="0.73" | 730 m || 
|-id=277 bgcolor=#E9E9E9
| 469277 ||  || — || October 9, 1993 || La Silla || E. W. Elst || — || align=right | 2.1 km || 
|-id=278 bgcolor=#fefefe
| 469278 ||  || — || September 2, 1994 || Kitt Peak || Spacewatch || — || align=right data-sort-value="0.75" | 750 m || 
|-id=279 bgcolor=#fefefe
| 469279 ||  || — || August 22, 1995 || Kitt Peak || Spacewatch || — || align=right data-sort-value="0.61" | 610 m || 
|-id=280 bgcolor=#d6d6d6
| 469280 ||  || — || September 25, 1995 || Kitt Peak || Spacewatch || — || align=right | 2.3 km || 
|-id=281 bgcolor=#d6d6d6
| 469281 ||  || — || October 15, 1995 || Kitt Peak || Spacewatch || THM || align=right | 2.3 km || 
|-id=282 bgcolor=#d6d6d6
| 469282 ||  || — || October 17, 1995 || Kitt Peak || Spacewatch || HYG || align=right | 3.0 km || 
|-id=283 bgcolor=#d6d6d6
| 469283 ||  || — || October 19, 1995 || Kitt Peak || Spacewatch || — || align=right | 2.5 km || 
|-id=284 bgcolor=#d6d6d6
| 469284 ||  || — || October 19, 1995 || Kitt Peak || Spacewatch || — || align=right | 2.4 km || 
|-id=285 bgcolor=#d6d6d6
| 469285 ||  || — || October 17, 1995 || Kitt Peak || Spacewatch || EOS || align=right | 1.8 km || 
|-id=286 bgcolor=#fefefe
| 469286 ||  || — || October 25, 1995 || Kitt Peak || Spacewatch || — || align=right data-sort-value="0.67" | 670 m || 
|-id=287 bgcolor=#d6d6d6
| 469287 ||  || — || October 23, 1995 || Kitt Peak || Spacewatch || — || align=right | 2.2 km || 
|-id=288 bgcolor=#d6d6d6
| 469288 ||  || — || November 15, 1995 || Kitt Peak || Spacewatch || — || align=right | 3.0 km || 
|-id=289 bgcolor=#d6d6d6
| 469289 ||  || — || November 15, 1995 || Kitt Peak || Spacewatch || THM || align=right | 2.1 km || 
|-id=290 bgcolor=#fefefe
| 469290 ||  || — || October 7, 1996 || Kitt Peak || Spacewatch || — || align=right data-sort-value="0.83" | 830 m || 
|-id=291 bgcolor=#fefefe
| 469291 ||  || — || November 4, 1996 || Kitt Peak || Spacewatch || — || align=right data-sort-value="0.71" | 710 m || 
|-id=292 bgcolor=#d6d6d6
| 469292 ||  || — || November 7, 1996 || Kitt Peak || Spacewatch || EOS || align=right | 1.6 km || 
|-id=293 bgcolor=#E9E9E9
| 469293 ||  || — || December 6, 1996 || Kitt Peak || Spacewatch || — || align=right data-sort-value="0.72" | 720 m || 
|-id=294 bgcolor=#fefefe
| 469294 ||  || — || December 1, 1996 || Kitt Peak || Spacewatch || — || align=right data-sort-value="0.64" | 640 m || 
|-id=295 bgcolor=#E9E9E9
| 469295 ||  || — || December 7, 1996 || Kitt Peak || Spacewatch || — || align=right | 1.0 km || 
|-id=296 bgcolor=#d6d6d6
| 469296 ||  || — || December 12, 1996 || Kitt Peak || Spacewatch || — || align=right | 2.3 km || 
|-id=297 bgcolor=#E9E9E9
| 469297 ||  || — || January 31, 1997 || Kitt Peak || Spacewatch || — || align=right | 1.3 km || 
|-id=298 bgcolor=#fefefe
| 469298 ||  || — || March 5, 1997 || Kitt Peak || Spacewatch || — || align=right data-sort-value="0.63" | 630 m || 
|-id=299 bgcolor=#fefefe
| 469299 ||  || — || May 28, 1997 || Kitt Peak || Spacewatch || — || align=right | 1.0 km || 
|-id=300 bgcolor=#fefefe
| 469300 ||  || — || May 30, 1997 || Kitt Peak || Spacewatch || — || align=right data-sort-value="0.68" | 680 m || 
|}

469301–469400 

|-bgcolor=#E9E9E9
| 469301 ||  || — || September 27, 1997 || Kitt Peak || Spacewatch || — || align=right | 1.8 km || 
|-id=302 bgcolor=#E9E9E9
| 469302 ||  || — || September 26, 1998 || Kitt Peak || Spacewatch || — || align=right | 1.6 km || 
|-id=303 bgcolor=#E9E9E9
| 469303 ||  || — || October 13, 1998 || Kitt Peak || Spacewatch || — || align=right | 2.9 km || 
|-id=304 bgcolor=#E9E9E9
| 469304 ||  || — || October 20, 1998 || Prescott || P. G. Comba || — || align=right | 2.1 km || 
|-id=305 bgcolor=#fefefe
| 469305 ||  || — || December 25, 1998 || Kitt Peak || Spacewatch || — || align=right data-sort-value="0.71" | 710 m || 
|-id=306 bgcolor=#C2E0FF
| 469306 ||  || — || February 10, 1999 || Mauna Kea || J. X. Luu, D. C. Jewitt, C. Trujillo || other TNOcritical || align=right | 389 km || 
|-id=307 bgcolor=#FA8072
| 469307 ||  || — || September 5, 1999 || Anderson Mesa || LONEOS || — || align=right | 1.2 km || 
|-id=308 bgcolor=#FA8072
| 469308 ||  || — || September 8, 1999 || Socorro || LINEAR || — || align=right | 1.3 km || 
|-id=309 bgcolor=#E9E9E9
| 469309 ||  || — || September 4, 1999 || Anderson Mesa || LONEOS || (1547) || align=right | 1.7 km || 
|-id=310 bgcolor=#E9E9E9
| 469310 ||  || — || August 11, 1999 || Socorro || LINEAR || — || align=right | 1.8 km || 
|-id=311 bgcolor=#E9E9E9
| 469311 ||  || — || September 9, 1999 || Socorro || LINEAR || (1547) || align=right | 1.5 km || 
|-id=312 bgcolor=#fefefe
| 469312 ||  || — || September 30, 1999 || Catalina || CSS || — || align=right data-sort-value="0.62" | 620 m || 
|-id=313 bgcolor=#d6d6d6
| 469313 ||  || — || October 4, 1999 || Kitt Peak || Spacewatch || — || align=right | 2.5 km || 
|-id=314 bgcolor=#E9E9E9
| 469314 ||  || — || October 7, 1999 || Kitt Peak || Spacewatch || — || align=right | 1.9 km || 
|-id=315 bgcolor=#E9E9E9
| 469315 ||  || — || October 6, 1999 || Socorro || LINEAR || — || align=right | 1.2 km || 
|-id=316 bgcolor=#E9E9E9
| 469316 ||  || — || September 18, 1999 || Socorro || LINEAR || (1547) || align=right | 1.6 km || 
|-id=317 bgcolor=#fefefe
| 469317 ||  || — || October 15, 1999 || Socorro || LINEAR || — || align=right data-sort-value="0.67" | 670 m || 
|-id=318 bgcolor=#d6d6d6
| 469318 ||  || — || October 1, 1999 || Kitt Peak || Spacewatch || — || align=right | 2.6 km || 
|-id=319 bgcolor=#E9E9E9
| 469319 ||  || — || September 14, 1999 || Socorro || LINEAR || — || align=right | 1.5 km || 
|-id=320 bgcolor=#E9E9E9
| 469320 ||  || — || September 7, 1999 || Socorro || LINEAR || (1547) || align=right | 1.7 km || 
|-id=321 bgcolor=#E9E9E9
| 469321 ||  || — || September 18, 1999 || Kitt Peak || Spacewatch || EUNcritical || align=right data-sort-value="0.92" | 920 m || 
|-id=322 bgcolor=#E9E9E9
| 469322 ||  || — || October 10, 1999 || Kitt Peak || Spacewatch || MIS || align=right | 2.0 km || 
|-id=323 bgcolor=#d6d6d6
| 469323 ||  || — || October 6, 1999 || Socorro || LINEAR || EOS || align=right | 1.7 km || 
|-id=324 bgcolor=#E9E9E9
| 469324 ||  || — || October 31, 1999 || Kitt Peak || Spacewatch || — || align=right | 1.7 km || 
|-id=325 bgcolor=#fefefe
| 469325 ||  || — || November 9, 1999 || Socorro || LINEAR || — || align=right data-sort-value="0.69" | 690 m || 
|-id=326 bgcolor=#fefefe
| 469326 ||  || — || November 12, 1999 || Socorro || LINEAR || — || align=right data-sort-value="0.71" | 710 m || 
|-id=327 bgcolor=#E9E9E9
| 469327 ||  || — || October 19, 1999 || Kitt Peak || Spacewatch || — || align=right | 1.5 km || 
|-id=328 bgcolor=#fefefe
| 469328 ||  || — || November 17, 1999 || Kitt Peak || Spacewatch || — || align=right data-sort-value="0.52" | 520 m || 
|-id=329 bgcolor=#FA8072
| 469329 ||  || — || December 28, 1999 || Socorro || LINEAR || — || align=right | 1.2 km || 
|-id=330 bgcolor=#fefefe
| 469330 ||  || — || April 3, 2000 || Kitt Peak || Spacewatch || — || align=right data-sort-value="0.94" | 940 m || 
|-id=331 bgcolor=#fefefe
| 469331 ||  || — || March 29, 2000 || Kitt Peak || Spacewatch || NYS || align=right data-sort-value="0.53" | 530 m || 
|-id=332 bgcolor=#d6d6d6
| 469332 ||  || — || May 24, 2000 || Kitt Peak || Spacewatch || critical || align=right | 1.7 km || 
|-id=333 bgcolor=#C2E0FF
| 469333 ||  || — || August 5, 2000 || Mauna Kea || M. J. Holman || SDOcritical || align=right | 293 km || 
|-id=334 bgcolor=#E9E9E9
| 469334 ||  || — || August 26, 2000 || Cerro Tololo || M. W. Buie || — || align=right data-sort-value="0.94" | 940 m || 
|-id=335 bgcolor=#E9E9E9
| 469335 ||  || — || September 23, 2000 || Socorro || LINEAR || — || align=right data-sort-value="0.91" | 910 m || 
|-id=336 bgcolor=#d6d6d6
| 469336 ||  || — || September 1, 2000 || Socorro || LINEAR || — || align=right | 3.3 km || 
|-id=337 bgcolor=#E9E9E9
| 469337 ||  || — || September 24, 2000 || Socorro || LINEAR || — || align=right | 1.0 km || 
|-id=338 bgcolor=#FA8072
| 469338 ||  || — || September 23, 2000 || Socorro || LINEAR || — || align=right data-sort-value="0.91" | 910 m || 
|-id=339 bgcolor=#E9E9E9
| 469339 ||  || — || September 24, 2000 || Socorro || LINEAR || — || align=right data-sort-value="0.90" | 900 m || 
|-id=340 bgcolor=#d6d6d6
| 469340 ||  || — || September 23, 2000 || Anderson Mesa || LONEOS || — || align=right | 2.9 km || 
|-id=341 bgcolor=#FA8072
| 469341 ||  || — || September 27, 2000 || Socorro || LINEAR || — || align=right data-sort-value="0.64" | 640 m || 
|-id=342 bgcolor=#d6d6d6
| 469342 ||  || — || September 7, 2000 || Kitt Peak || Spacewatch || — || align=right | 3.4 km || 
|-id=343 bgcolor=#d6d6d6
| 469343 ||  || — || September 26, 2000 || Socorro || LINEAR || — || align=right | 3.7 km || 
|-id=344 bgcolor=#E9E9E9
| 469344 ||  || — || October 1, 2000 || Socorro || LINEAR || (5) || align=right data-sort-value="0.65" | 650 m || 
|-id=345 bgcolor=#d6d6d6
| 469345 ||  || — || October 1, 2000 || Socorro || LINEAR || — || align=right | 2.8 km || 
|-id=346 bgcolor=#FA8072
| 469346 ||  || — || October 5, 2000 || Kitt Peak || Spacewatch || — || align=right data-sort-value="0.59" | 590 m || 
|-id=347 bgcolor=#d6d6d6
| 469347 ||  || — || October 2, 2000 || Socorro || LINEAR || — || align=right | 3.5 km || 
|-id=348 bgcolor=#E9E9E9
| 469348 ||  || — || October 25, 2000 || Socorro || LINEAR || — || align=right | 1.4 km || 
|-id=349 bgcolor=#E9E9E9
| 469349 ||  || — || October 25, 2000 || Socorro || LINEAR || — || align=right | 1.1 km || 
|-id=350 bgcolor=#E9E9E9
| 469350 ||  || — || November 21, 2000 || Socorro || LINEAR || — || align=right | 1.1 km || 
|-id=351 bgcolor=#E9E9E9
| 469351 ||  || — || November 20, 2000 || Socorro || LINEAR || (5) || align=right data-sort-value="0.85" | 850 m || 
|-id=352 bgcolor=#E9E9E9
| 469352 ||  || — || November 20, 2000 || Socorro || LINEAR || — || align=right | 1.1 km || 
|-id=353 bgcolor=#E9E9E9
| 469353 ||  || — || December 30, 2000 || Socorro || LINEAR || — || align=right | 1.8 km || 
|-id=354 bgcolor=#fefefe
| 469354 ||  || — || January 18, 2001 || Socorro || LINEAR || — || align=right | 1.2 km || 
|-id=355 bgcolor=#E9E9E9
| 469355 ||  || — || February 1, 2001 || Socorro || LINEAR || — || align=right | 3.2 km || 
|-id=356 bgcolor=#FFC2E0
| 469356 ||  || — || February 16, 2001 || Kitt Peak || Spacewatch || APOcritical || align=right data-sort-value="0.62" | 620 m || 
|-id=357 bgcolor=#d6d6d6
| 469357 ||  || — || February 16, 2001 || Socorro || LINEAR || Tj (2.94) || align=right | 4.4 km || 
|-id=358 bgcolor=#E9E9E9
| 469358 ||  || — || March 20, 2001 || Kitt Peak || Spacewatch || EUN || align=right | 1.2 km || 
|-id=359 bgcolor=#FA8072
| 469359 ||  || — || April 23, 2001 || Kitt Peak || Spacewatch || critical || align=right data-sort-value="0.59" | 590 m || 
|-id=360 bgcolor=#fefefe
| 469360 ||  || — || April 27, 2001 || Kitt Peak || Spacewatch || — || align=right data-sort-value="0.54" | 540 m || 
|-id=361 bgcolor=#C2E0FF
| 469361 ||  || — || April 26, 2001 || Mauna Kea || K. J. Meech, M. W. Buie || other TNOcritical || align=right | 229 km || 
|-id=362 bgcolor=#C2E0FF
| 469362 ||  || — || May 23, 2001 || Cerro Tololo || M. W. Buie || plutinocritical || align=right | 147 km || 
|-id=363 bgcolor=#fefefe
| 469363 ||  || — || May 24, 2001 || Cerro Tololo || M. W. Buie || — || align=right data-sort-value="0.88" | 880 m || 
|-id=364 bgcolor=#fefefe
| 469364 ||  || — || July 12, 2001 || Palomar || NEAT || — || align=right data-sort-value="0.78" | 780 m || 
|-id=365 bgcolor=#fefefe
| 469365 ||  || — || July 20, 2001 || Palomar || NEAT || — || align=right data-sort-value="0.78" | 780 m || 
|-id=366 bgcolor=#FA8072
| 469366 Watkins ||  ||  || August 11, 2001 || Haleakala || NEAT || unusual || align=right | 1.3 km || 
|-id=367 bgcolor=#fefefe
| 469367 ||  || — || August 14, 2001 || Haleakala || NEAT || NYS || align=right data-sort-value="0.67" | 670 m || 
|-id=368 bgcolor=#fefefe
| 469368 ||  || — || August 25, 2001 || Kitt Peak || Spacewatch || — || align=right data-sort-value="0.67" | 670 m || 
|-id=369 bgcolor=#FA8072
| 469369 ||  || — || July 27, 2001 || Anderson Mesa || LONEOS || — || align=right data-sort-value="0.71" | 710 m || 
|-id=370 bgcolor=#fefefe
| 469370 ||  || — || August 23, 2001 || Anderson Mesa || LONEOS || MAS || align=right data-sort-value="0.90" | 900 m || 
|-id=371 bgcolor=#fefefe
| 469371 ||  || — || August 24, 2001 || Anderson Mesa || LONEOS || — || align=right data-sort-value="0.85" | 850 m || 
|-id=372 bgcolor=#C2E0FF
| 469372 ||  || — || August 19, 2001 || Cerro Tololo || M. W. Buie || plutino || align=right | 374 km || 
|-id=373 bgcolor=#FFC2E0
| 469373 ||  || — || September 9, 2001 || Anderson Mesa || LONEOS || AMOcritical || align=right data-sort-value="0.54" | 540 m || 
|-id=374 bgcolor=#fefefe
| 469374 ||  || — || September 7, 2001 || Socorro || LINEAR || — || align=right data-sort-value="0.75" | 750 m || 
|-id=375 bgcolor=#fefefe
| 469375 ||  || — || September 12, 2001 || Socorro || LINEAR || — || align=right data-sort-value="0.88" | 880 m || 
|-id=376 bgcolor=#fefefe
| 469376 ||  || — || September 15, 2001 || Palomar || NEAT || — || align=right data-sort-value="0.80" | 800 m || 
|-id=377 bgcolor=#d6d6d6
| 469377 ||  || — || September 12, 2001 || Kitt Peak || Spacewatch || — || align=right | 3.2 km || 
|-id=378 bgcolor=#d6d6d6
| 469378 ||  || — || September 20, 2001 || Socorro || LINEAR || — || align=right | 2.8 km || 
|-id=379 bgcolor=#d6d6d6
| 469379 ||  || — || September 17, 2001 || Socorro || LINEAR || — || align=right | 2.3 km || 
|-id=380 bgcolor=#fefefe
| 469380 ||  || — || September 19, 2001 || Socorro || LINEAR || MAS || align=right data-sort-value="0.71" | 710 m || 
|-id=381 bgcolor=#fefefe
| 469381 ||  || — || September 19, 2001 || Socorro || LINEAR || — || align=right data-sort-value="0.86" | 860 m || 
|-id=382 bgcolor=#fefefe
| 469382 ||  || — || September 19, 2001 || Socorro || LINEAR || — || align=right data-sort-value="0.67" | 670 m || 
|-id=383 bgcolor=#fefefe
| 469383 ||  || — || September 19, 2001 || Socorro || LINEAR || — || align=right data-sort-value="0.84" | 840 m || 
|-id=384 bgcolor=#d6d6d6
| 469384 ||  || — || September 19, 2001 || Socorro || LINEAR || EOS || align=right | 1.9 km || 
|-id=385 bgcolor=#d6d6d6
| 469385 ||  || — || September 19, 2001 || Socorro || LINEAR || — || align=right | 2.5 km || 
|-id=386 bgcolor=#E9E9E9
| 469386 ||  || — || September 19, 2001 || Socorro || LINEAR || — || align=right | 2.0 km || 
|-id=387 bgcolor=#fefefe
| 469387 ||  || — || September 20, 2001 || Socorro || LINEAR || — || align=right data-sort-value="0.71" | 710 m || 
|-id=388 bgcolor=#d6d6d6
| 469388 ||  || — || September 21, 2001 || Socorro || LINEAR || — || align=right | 2.6 km || 
|-id=389 bgcolor=#fefefe
| 469389 ||  || — || September 21, 2001 || Socorro || LINEAR || — || align=right data-sort-value="0.94" | 940 m || 
|-id=390 bgcolor=#fefefe
| 469390 ||  || — || September 19, 2001 || Kitt Peak || Spacewatch || NYS || align=right data-sort-value="0.59" | 590 m || 
|-id=391 bgcolor=#d6d6d6
| 469391 ||  || — || September 19, 2001 || Kitt Peak || Spacewatch || — || align=right | 2.7 km || 
|-id=392 bgcolor=#fefefe
| 469392 ||  || — || October 14, 2001 || Socorro || LINEAR || — || align=right data-sort-value="0.85" | 850 m || 
|-id=393 bgcolor=#FA8072
| 469393 ||  || — || October 14, 2001 || Socorro || LINEAR || — || align=right | 2.0 km || 
|-id=394 bgcolor=#fefefe
| 469394 ||  || — || September 10, 2001 || Socorro || LINEAR || — || align=right data-sort-value="0.91" | 910 m || 
|-id=395 bgcolor=#fefefe
| 469395 ||  || — || October 11, 2001 || Palomar || NEAT || MAS || align=right data-sort-value="0.70" | 700 m || 
|-id=396 bgcolor=#fefefe
| 469396 ||  || — || October 11, 2001 || Palomar || NEAT || — || align=right data-sort-value="0.81" | 810 m || 
|-id=397 bgcolor=#d6d6d6
| 469397 ||  || — || October 13, 2001 || Palomar || NEAT || — || align=right | 2.5 km || 
|-id=398 bgcolor=#fefefe
| 469398 ||  || — || October 14, 2001 || Apache Point || SDSS || MAS || align=right data-sort-value="0.81" | 810 m || 
|-id=399 bgcolor=#d6d6d6
| 469399 ||  || — || September 20, 2001 || Socorro || LINEAR || — || align=right | 3.8 km || 
|-id=400 bgcolor=#E9E9E9
| 469400 ||  || — || October 18, 2001 || Socorro || LINEAR || — || align=right data-sort-value="0.96" | 960 m || 
|}

469401–469500 

|-bgcolor=#fefefe
| 469401 ||  || — || October 17, 2001 || Socorro || LINEAR || NYS || align=right data-sort-value="0.66" | 660 m || 
|-id=402 bgcolor=#d6d6d6
| 469402 ||  || — || October 21, 2001 || Kitt Peak || Spacewatch || — || align=right | 2.8 km || 
|-id=403 bgcolor=#fefefe
| 469403 ||  || — || October 23, 2001 || Kitt Peak || Spacewatch || NYS || align=right data-sort-value="0.65" | 650 m || 
|-id=404 bgcolor=#fefefe
| 469404 ||  || — || October 23, 2001 || Socorro || LINEAR || — || align=right data-sort-value="0.82" | 820 m || 
|-id=405 bgcolor=#d6d6d6
| 469405 ||  || — || October 19, 2001 || Palomar || NEAT || — || align=right | 1.7 km || 
|-id=406 bgcolor=#E9E9E9
| 469406 ||  || — || September 18, 2001 || Kitt Peak || Spacewatch || EUN || align=right data-sort-value="0.92" | 920 m || 
|-id=407 bgcolor=#fefefe
| 469407 ||  || — || October 16, 2001 || Kitt Peak || Spacewatch || MAS || align=right data-sort-value="0.76" | 760 m || 
|-id=408 bgcolor=#d6d6d6
| 469408 ||  || — || October 23, 2001 || Socorro || LINEAR || — || align=right | 3.3 km || 
|-id=409 bgcolor=#d6d6d6
| 469409 ||  || — || October 16, 2001 || Palomar || NEAT || — || align=right | 2.5 km || 
|-id=410 bgcolor=#fefefe
| 469410 ||  || — || November 10, 2001 || Socorro || LINEAR || — || align=right | 1.2 km || 
|-id=411 bgcolor=#fefefe
| 469411 ||  || — || November 12, 2001 || Kitt Peak || Spacewatch || — || align=right data-sort-value="0.64" | 640 m || 
|-id=412 bgcolor=#d6d6d6
| 469412 ||  || — || November 17, 2001 || Socorro || LINEAR || — || align=right | 2.3 km || 
|-id=413 bgcolor=#fefefe
| 469413 ||  || — || November 17, 2001 || Socorro || LINEAR || — || align=right data-sort-value="0.94" | 940 m || 
|-id=414 bgcolor=#fefefe
| 469414 ||  || — || November 19, 2001 || Socorro || LINEAR || NYS || align=right data-sort-value="0.61" | 610 m || 
|-id=415 bgcolor=#d6d6d6
| 469415 ||  || — || December 11, 2001 || Socorro || LINEAR || — || align=right | 2.5 km || 
|-id=416 bgcolor=#d6d6d6
| 469416 ||  || — || December 14, 2001 || Socorro || LINEAR || — || align=right | 2.3 km || 
|-id=417 bgcolor=#fefefe
| 469417 ||  || — || December 15, 2001 || Socorro || LINEAR || — || align=right data-sort-value="0.96" | 960 m || 
|-id=418 bgcolor=#d6d6d6
| 469418 ||  || — || November 12, 2001 || Socorro || LINEAR || — || align=right | 3.1 km || 
|-id=419 bgcolor=#d6d6d6
| 469419 ||  || — || December 14, 2001 || Kitt Peak || Spacewatch || — || align=right | 3.7 km || 
|-id=420 bgcolor=#C2E0FF
| 469420 ||  || — || December 10, 2001 || Mauna Kea || D. C. Jewitt, S. S. Sheppard, J. Kleyna || res3:5moon || align=right | 124 km || 
|-id=421 bgcolor=#C2E0FF
| 469421 ||  || — || December 9, 2001 || Mauna Kea || S. S. Sheppard, D. C. Jewitt, J. Kleyna || plutino || align=right | 308 km || 
|-id=422 bgcolor=#d6d6d6
| 469422 ||  || — || December 10, 2001 || Kitt Peak || Spacewatch || — || align=right | 3.0 km || 
|-id=423 bgcolor=#d6d6d6
| 469423 ||  || — || December 17, 2001 || Socorro || LINEAR || — || align=right | 3.5 km || 
|-id=424 bgcolor=#d6d6d6
| 469424 ||  || — || December 18, 2001 || Socorro || LINEAR || — || align=right | 3.8 km || 
|-id=425 bgcolor=#d6d6d6
| 469425 ||  || — || December 17, 2001 || Socorro || LINEAR || — || align=right | 3.9 km || 
|-id=426 bgcolor=#d6d6d6
| 469426 ||  || — || January 9, 2002 || Socorro || LINEAR || — || align=right | 3.3 km || 
|-id=427 bgcolor=#fefefe
| 469427 ||  || — || December 23, 2001 || Socorro || LINEAR || H || align=right data-sort-value="0.57" | 570 m || 
|-id=428 bgcolor=#E9E9E9
| 469428 ||  || — || January 13, 2002 || Socorro || LINEAR || — || align=right data-sort-value="0.93" | 930 m || 
|-id=429 bgcolor=#d6d6d6
| 469429 ||  || — || January 18, 2002 || Anderson Mesa || LONEOS || Tj (2.99) || align=right | 3.9 km || 
|-id=430 bgcolor=#FA8072
| 469430 ||  || — || February 6, 2002 || Socorro || LINEAR || H || align=right data-sort-value="0.67" | 670 m || 
|-id=431 bgcolor=#d6d6d6
| 469431 ||  || — || January 8, 2002 || Socorro || LINEAR || — || align=right | 3.7 km || 
|-id=432 bgcolor=#fefefe
| 469432 ||  || — || February 3, 2002 || Palomar || NEAT || H || align=right data-sort-value="0.62" | 620 m || 
|-id=433 bgcolor=#E9E9E9
| 469433 ||  || — || February 7, 2002 || Kitt Peak || Spacewatch || — || align=right | 3.5 km || 
|-id=434 bgcolor=#E9E9E9
| 469434 ||  || — || February 18, 2002 || Cima Ekar || ADAS || — || align=right | 1.0 km || 
|-id=435 bgcolor=#E9E9E9
| 469435 ||  || — || February 20, 2002 || Socorro || LINEAR || — || align=right | 1.8 km || 
|-id=436 bgcolor=#fefefe
| 469436 ||  || — || March 9, 2002 || Palomar || NEAT || — || align=right data-sort-value="0.62" | 620 m || 
|-id=437 bgcolor=#d6d6d6
| 469437 ||  || — || March 22, 2002 || Palomar || NEAT || Tj (2.99) || align=right | 3.2 km || 
|-id=438 bgcolor=#C2E0FF
| 469438 ||  || — || April 6, 2002 || Cerro Tololo || M. W. Buie || cubewano (cold)critical || align=right | 233 km || 
|-id=439 bgcolor=#E9E9E9
| 469439 ||  || — || March 15, 2002 || Kitt Peak || Spacewatch || JUN || align=right data-sort-value="0.81" | 810 m || 
|-id=440 bgcolor=#E9E9E9
| 469440 ||  || — || April 10, 2002 || Socorro || LINEAR || — || align=right | 1.6 km || 
|-id=441 bgcolor=#FA8072
| 469441 ||  || — || April 2, 2002 || Kitt Peak || Spacewatch || — || align=right | 1.3 km || 
|-id=442 bgcolor=#C2E0FF
| 469442 ||  || — || April 9, 2002 || Cerro Tololo || M. W. Buie || centaurcritical || align=right | 100 km || 
|-id=443 bgcolor=#fefefe
| 469443 ||  || — || May 17, 2002 || Socorro || LINEAR || — || align=right | 1.0 km || 
|-id=444 bgcolor=#fefefe
| 469444 ||  || — || May 18, 2002 || Socorro || LINEAR || — || align=right | 1.1 km || 
|-id=445 bgcolor=#FFC2E0
| 469445 ||  || — || June 9, 2002 || Socorro || LINEAR || ATE || align=right data-sort-value="0.14" | 140 m || 
|-id=446 bgcolor=#FA8072
| 469446 ||  || — || July 9, 2002 || Socorro || LINEAR || — || align=right data-sort-value="0.87" | 870 m || 
|-id=447 bgcolor=#E9E9E9
| 469447 ||  || — || July 3, 2002 || Palomar || NEAT || — || align=right | 2.0 km || 
|-id=448 bgcolor=#fefefe
| 469448 ||  || — || July 8, 2002 || Palomar || NEAT || — || align=right data-sort-value="0.58" | 580 m || 
|-id=449 bgcolor=#FA8072
| 469449 ||  || — || July 21, 2002 || Palomar || NEAT || — || align=right | 1.2 km || 
|-id=450 bgcolor=#fefefe
| 469450 ||  || — || August 3, 2002 || Palomar || NEAT || — || align=right | 1.1 km || 
|-id=451 bgcolor=#E9E9E9
| 469451 ||  || — || August 5, 2002 || Palomar || NEAT || — || align=right | 1.9 km || 
|-id=452 bgcolor=#E9E9E9
| 469452 ||  || — || August 12, 2002 || Socorro || LINEAR || — || align=right | 2.3 km || 
|-id=453 bgcolor=#E9E9E9
| 469453 ||  || — || August 12, 2002 || Socorro || LINEAR || — || align=right | 1.8 km || 
|-id=454 bgcolor=#E9E9E9
| 469454 ||  || — || August 8, 2002 || Palomar || S. F. Hönig || — || align=right | 1.2 km || 
|-id=455 bgcolor=#E9E9E9
| 469455 ||  || — || August 8, 2002 || Anderson Mesa || LONEOS || — || align=right | 2.1 km || 
|-id=456 bgcolor=#E9E9E9
| 469456 ||  || — || August 30, 2002 || Kitt Peak || Spacewatch || — || align=right | 1.8 km || 
|-id=457 bgcolor=#FA8072
| 469457 ||  || — || August 30, 2002 || Palomar || NEAT || — || align=right data-sort-value="0.72" | 720 m || 
|-id=458 bgcolor=#fefefe
| 469458 ||  || — || August 17, 2002 || Palomar || A. Lowe || — || align=right data-sort-value="0.68" | 680 m || 
|-id=459 bgcolor=#fefefe
| 469459 ||  || — || August 28, 2002 || Palomar || NEAT || — || align=right data-sort-value="0.73" | 730 m || 
|-id=460 bgcolor=#fefefe
| 469460 ||  || — || August 19, 2002 || Palomar || NEAT || — || align=right data-sort-value="0.66" | 660 m || 
|-id=461 bgcolor=#fefefe
| 469461 ||  || — || August 16, 2002 || Palomar || NEAT || — || align=right data-sort-value="0.57" | 570 m || 
|-id=462 bgcolor=#fefefe
| 469462 ||  || — || August 19, 2002 || Palomar || NEAT || — || align=right data-sort-value="0.72" | 720 m || 
|-id=463 bgcolor=#E9E9E9
| 469463 ||  || — || August 18, 2002 || Palomar || NEAT || — || align=right | 1.8 km || 
|-id=464 bgcolor=#fefefe
| 469464 ||  || — || August 27, 2002 || Palomar || NEAT || — || align=right data-sort-value="0.59" | 590 m || 
|-id=465 bgcolor=#E9E9E9
| 469465 ||  || — || September 5, 2002 || Anderson Mesa || LONEOS || — || align=right | 2.2 km || 
|-id=466 bgcolor=#fefefe
| 469466 ||  || — || September 5, 2002 || Anderson Mesa || LONEOS || — || align=right data-sort-value="0.76" | 760 m || 
|-id=467 bgcolor=#fefefe
| 469467 ||  || — || September 6, 2002 || Socorro || LINEAR || — || align=right data-sort-value="0.90" | 900 m || 
|-id=468 bgcolor=#d6d6d6
| 469468 ||  || — || September 9, 2002 || Haleakala || NEAT || — || align=right | 2.5 km || 
|-id=469 bgcolor=#E9E9E9
| 469469 ||  || — || September 11, 2002 || Palomar || NEAT || — || align=right | 2.5 km || 
|-id=470 bgcolor=#fefefe
| 469470 ||  || — || September 13, 2002 || Palomar || NEAT || — || align=right data-sort-value="0.81" | 810 m || 
|-id=471 bgcolor=#E9E9E9
| 469471 ||  || — || September 13, 2002 || Palomar || NEAT || — || align=right | 2.4 km || 
|-id=472 bgcolor=#E9E9E9
| 469472 ||  || — || September 6, 2002 || Socorro || LINEAR || — || align=right | 2.4 km || 
|-id=473 bgcolor=#fefefe
| 469473 ||  || — || September 13, 2002 || Haleakala || NEAT || — || align=right data-sort-value="0.74" | 740 m || 
|-id=474 bgcolor=#fefefe
| 469474 ||  || — || September 1, 2002 || Haleakala || R. Matson || H || align=right data-sort-value="0.69" | 690 m || 
|-id=475 bgcolor=#E9E9E9
| 469475 ||  || — || September 15, 2002 || Palomar || NEAT || — || align=right | 2.0 km || 
|-id=476 bgcolor=#fefefe
| 469476 ||  || — || September 1, 2002 || Palomar || NEAT || — || align=right data-sort-value="0.54" | 540 m || 
|-id=477 bgcolor=#fefefe
| 469477 ||  || — || September 27, 2002 || Palomar || NEAT || — || align=right data-sort-value="0.80" | 800 m || 
|-id=478 bgcolor=#FA8072
| 469478 ||  || — || October 1, 2002 || Anderson Mesa || LONEOS || — || align=right data-sort-value="0.78" | 780 m || 
|-id=479 bgcolor=#fefefe
| 469479 ||  || — || October 3, 2002 || Palomar || NEAT || — || align=right data-sort-value="0.74" | 740 m || 
|-id=480 bgcolor=#fefefe
| 469480 ||  || — || October 1, 2002 || Anderson Mesa || LONEOS || — || align=right data-sort-value="0.65" | 650 m || 
|-id=481 bgcolor=#fefefe
| 469481 ||  || — || October 3, 2002 || Palomar || NEAT || — || align=right | 1.6 km || 
|-id=482 bgcolor=#E9E9E9
| 469482 ||  || — || October 4, 2002 || Palomar || NEAT || — || align=right | 2.8 km || 
|-id=483 bgcolor=#FA8072
| 469483 ||  || — || October 5, 2002 || Palomar || NEAT || — || align=right data-sort-value="0.68" | 680 m || 
|-id=484 bgcolor=#d6d6d6
| 469484 ||  || — || October 2, 2002 || Haleakala || NEAT || — || align=right | 2.8 km || 
|-id=485 bgcolor=#E9E9E9
| 469485 ||  || — || October 4, 2002 || Socorro || LINEAR || DOR || align=right | 2.8 km || 
|-id=486 bgcolor=#fefefe
| 469486 ||  || — || October 9, 2002 || Socorro || LINEAR || — || align=right data-sort-value="0.89" | 890 m || 
|-id=487 bgcolor=#fefefe
| 469487 ||  || — || October 13, 2002 || Kitt Peak || Spacewatch || — || align=right data-sort-value="0.83" | 830 m || 
|-id=488 bgcolor=#E9E9E9
| 469488 ||  || — || October 4, 2002 || Apache Point || SDSS || — || align=right | 2.1 km || 
|-id=489 bgcolor=#fefefe
| 469489 ||  || — || October 10, 2002 || Apache Point || SDSS || — || align=right data-sort-value="0.68" | 680 m || 
|-id=490 bgcolor=#fefefe
| 469490 ||  || — || October 10, 2002 || Apache Point || SDSS || — || align=right data-sort-value="0.54" | 540 m || 
|-id=491 bgcolor=#E9E9E9
| 469491 ||  || — || November 6, 2002 || Anderson Mesa || LONEOS || — || align=right | 3.4 km || 
|-id=492 bgcolor=#fefefe
| 469492 ||  || — || November 4, 2002 || Palomar || NEAT || — || align=right data-sort-value="0.64" | 640 m || 
|-id=493 bgcolor=#FA8072
| 469493 ||  || — || December 2, 2002 || Haleakala || NEAT || — || align=right data-sort-value="0.69" | 690 m || 
|-id=494 bgcolor=#FFC2E0
| 469494 ||  || — || December 12, 2002 || Palomar || NEAT || APOcritical || align=right data-sort-value="0.76" | 760 m || 
|-id=495 bgcolor=#fefefe
| 469495 ||  || — || December 10, 2002 || Socorro || LINEAR || — || align=right data-sort-value="0.72" | 720 m || 
|-id=496 bgcolor=#fefefe
| 469496 ||  || — || December 6, 2002 || Socorro || LINEAR || — || align=right data-sort-value="0.87" | 870 m || 
|-id=497 bgcolor=#d6d6d6
| 469497 ||  || — || December 10, 2002 || Palomar || NEAT || — || align=right | 2.5 km || 
|-id=498 bgcolor=#fefefe
| 469498 ||  || — || December 31, 2002 || Socorro || LINEAR || — || align=right | 1.9 km || 
|-id=499 bgcolor=#E9E9E9
| 469499 ||  || — || December 31, 2002 || Kitt Peak || Spacewatch || — || align=right data-sort-value="0.92" | 920 m || 
|-id=500 bgcolor=#d6d6d6
| 469500 ||  || — || January 4, 2003 || Kitt Peak || Spacewatch || — || align=right | 3.3 km || 
|}

469501–469600 

|-bgcolor=#E9E9E9
| 469501 ||  || — || January 26, 2003 || Haleakala || NEAT || EUN || align=right | 1.3 km || 
|-id=502 bgcolor=#FA8072
| 469502 ||  || — || January 27, 2003 || Anderson Mesa || LONEOS || — || align=right data-sort-value="0.46" | 460 m || 
|-id=503 bgcolor=#FA8072
| 469503 ||  || — || February 23, 2003 || Socorro || LINEAR || — || align=right data-sort-value="0.98" | 980 m || 
|-id=504 bgcolor=#E9E9E9
| 469504 ||  || — || March 22, 2003 || Palomar || NEAT || critical || align=right | 1.0 km || 
|-id=505 bgcolor=#C2E0FF
| 469505 ||  || — || March 31, 2003 || Kitt Peak || M. W. Buie || twotinomooncritical || align=right | 237 km || 
|-id=506 bgcolor=#C2E0FF
| 469506 ||  || — || March 31, 2003 || Kitt Peak || M. W. Buie || plutinocritical || align=right | 187 km || 
|-id=507 bgcolor=#d6d6d6
| 469507 ||  || — || April 25, 2003 || Kitt Peak || Spacewatch || — || align=right | 3.8 km || 
|-id=508 bgcolor=#E9E9E9
| 469508 ||  || — || April 29, 2003 || Socorro || LINEAR || — || align=right | 1.8 km || 
|-id=509 bgcolor=#C2E0FF
| 469509 ||  || — || April 26, 2003 || Mauna Kea || Mauna Kea Obs. || cubewano (cold)mooncritical || align=right | 285 km || 
|-id=510 bgcolor=#FA8072
| 469510 ||  || — || June 30, 2003 || Socorro || LINEAR || — || align=right | 2.1 km || 
|-id=511 bgcolor=#E9E9E9
| 469511 ||  || — || July 29, 2003 || Reedy Creek || J. Broughton || — || align=right | 2.8 km || 
|-id=512 bgcolor=#E9E9E9
| 469512 ||  || — || August 20, 2003 || Campo Imperatore || CINEOS || — || align=right | 1.5 km || 
|-id=513 bgcolor=#FFC2E0
| 469513 ||  || — || August 28, 2003 || Socorro || LINEAR || APOcritical || align=right data-sort-value="0.3" | 300 m || 
|-id=514 bgcolor=#C2E0FF
| 469514 ||  || — || August 24, 2003 || Cerro Tololo || M. W. Buie || cubewano (cold)mooncritical || align=right | 297 km || 
|-id=515 bgcolor=#fefefe
| 469515 ||  || — || September 1, 2003 || Socorro || LINEAR || H || align=right data-sort-value="0.56" | 560 m || 
|-id=516 bgcolor=#FA8072
| 469516 ||  || — || September 3, 2003 || Socorro || LINEAR || — || align=right data-sort-value="0.60" | 600 m || 
|-id=517 bgcolor=#E9E9E9
| 469517 ||  || — || September 17, 2003 || Kitt Peak || Spacewatch || — || align=right | 1.4 km || 
|-id=518 bgcolor=#E9E9E9
| 469518 ||  || — || September 2, 2003 || Socorro || LINEAR || — || align=right | 1.7 km || 
|-id=519 bgcolor=#E9E9E9
| 469519 ||  || — || September 16, 2003 || Palomar || NEAT || JUN || align=right | 1.1 km || 
|-id=520 bgcolor=#E9E9E9
| 469520 ||  || — || September 16, 2003 || Palomar || NEAT || — || align=right | 1.6 km || 
|-id=521 bgcolor=#E9E9E9
| 469521 ||  || — || September 16, 2003 || Anderson Mesa || LONEOS || — || align=right | 1.9 km || 
|-id=522 bgcolor=#E9E9E9
| 469522 ||  || — || September 16, 2003 || Anderson Mesa || LONEOS || ADE || align=right | 2.1 km || 
|-id=523 bgcolor=#E9E9E9
| 469523 ||  || — || September 17, 2003 || Kitt Peak || Spacewatch || — || align=right | 1.7 km || 
|-id=524 bgcolor=#E9E9E9
| 469524 ||  || — || September 18, 2003 || Kitt Peak || Spacewatch || — || align=right | 2.0 km || 
|-id=525 bgcolor=#fefefe
| 469525 ||  || — || September 19, 2003 || Anderson Mesa || LONEOS || — || align=right data-sort-value="0.63" | 630 m || 
|-id=526 bgcolor=#E9E9E9
| 469526 ||  || — || September 20, 2003 || Palomar || NEAT || ADE || align=right | 2.6 km || 
|-id=527 bgcolor=#fefefe
| 469527 ||  || — || September 19, 2003 || Anderson Mesa || LONEOS || — || align=right data-sort-value="0.62" | 620 m || 
|-id=528 bgcolor=#fefefe
| 469528 ||  || — || September 20, 2003 || Anderson Mesa || LONEOS || — || align=right data-sort-value="0.67" | 670 m || 
|-id=529 bgcolor=#fefefe
| 469529 ||  || — || September 17, 2003 || Kitt Peak || Spacewatch || — || align=right data-sort-value="0.71" | 710 m || 
|-id=530 bgcolor=#E9E9E9
| 469530 ||  || — || September 24, 2003 || Kvistaberg || UDAS || — || align=right | 1.2 km || 
|-id=531 bgcolor=#E9E9E9
| 469531 ||  || — || September 17, 2003 || Kitt Peak || Spacewatch || — || align=right | 1.1 km || 
|-id=532 bgcolor=#E9E9E9
| 469532 ||  || — || September 18, 2003 || Kitt Peak || Spacewatch || — || align=right | 1.3 km || 
|-id=533 bgcolor=#E9E9E9
| 469533 ||  || — || September 22, 2003 || Kitt Peak || Spacewatch || — || align=right | 1.7 km || 
|-id=534 bgcolor=#E9E9E9
| 469534 ||  || — || September 18, 2003 || Kitt Peak || Spacewatch || — || align=right | 1.4 km || 
|-id=535 bgcolor=#E9E9E9
| 469535 ||  || — || September 28, 2003 || Socorro || LINEAR || — || align=right | 2.2 km || 
|-id=536 bgcolor=#E9E9E9
| 469536 ||  || — || September 21, 2003 || Socorro || LINEAR || — || align=right | 2.8 km || 
|-id=537 bgcolor=#E9E9E9
| 469537 ||  || — || September 29, 2003 || Anderson Mesa || LONEOS || — || align=right | 1.7 km || 
|-id=538 bgcolor=#E9E9E9
| 469538 ||  || — || September 17, 2003 || Palomar || NEAT || — || align=right | 2.7 km || 
|-id=539 bgcolor=#E9E9E9
| 469539 ||  || — || September 16, 2003 || Kitt Peak || Spacewatch || — || align=right | 1.3 km || 
|-id=540 bgcolor=#E9E9E9
| 469540 ||  || — || September 16, 2003 || Kitt Peak || Spacewatch || — || align=right | 1.2 km || 
|-id=541 bgcolor=#fefefe
| 469541 ||  || — || September 26, 2003 || Apache Point || SDSS || — || align=right data-sort-value="0.64" | 640 m || 
|-id=542 bgcolor=#E9E9E9
| 469542 ||  || — || September 27, 2003 || Kitt Peak || Spacewatch || — || align=right | 1.2 km || 
|-id=543 bgcolor=#d6d6d6
| 469543 ||  || — || September 18, 2003 || Kitt Peak || Spacewatch || 7:4 || align=right | 2.9 km || 
|-id=544 bgcolor=#E9E9E9
| 469544 ||  || — || September 17, 2003 || Kitt Peak || Spacewatch || — || align=right | 1.3 km || 
|-id=545 bgcolor=#E9E9E9
| 469545 ||  || — || September 16, 2003 || Kitt Peak || Spacewatch || — || align=right | 1.3 km || 
|-id=546 bgcolor=#E9E9E9
| 469546 ||  || — || September 21, 2003 || Kitt Peak || Spacewatch || NEM || align=right | 1.7 km || 
|-id=547 bgcolor=#fefefe
| 469547 ||  || — || September 28, 2003 || Kitt Peak || Spacewatch || — || align=right data-sort-value="0.79" | 790 m || 
|-id=548 bgcolor=#E9E9E9
| 469548 ||  || — || September 21, 2003 || Anderson Mesa || LONEOS || — || align=right | 1.3 km || 
|-id=549 bgcolor=#E9E9E9
| 469549 ||  || — || October 20, 2003 || Socorro || LINEAR || JUN || align=right | 1.2 km || 
|-id=550 bgcolor=#E9E9E9
| 469550 ||  || — || October 16, 2003 || Palomar || NEAT || — || align=right | 2.6 km || 
|-id=551 bgcolor=#E9E9E9
| 469551 ||  || — || October 17, 2003 || Kitt Peak || Spacewatch || — || align=right | 2.2 km || 
|-id=552 bgcolor=#fefefe
| 469552 ||  || — || October 17, 2003 || Anderson Mesa || LONEOS || — || align=right data-sort-value="0.92" | 920 m || 
|-id=553 bgcolor=#E9E9E9
| 469553 ||  || — || October 18, 2003 || Palomar || NEAT || — || align=right | 2.5 km || 
|-id=554 bgcolor=#E9E9E9
| 469554 ||  || — || October 17, 2003 || Kitt Peak || Spacewatch || ADE || align=right | 2.0 km || 
|-id=555 bgcolor=#fefefe
| 469555 ||  || — || October 20, 2003 || Socorro || LINEAR || — || align=right data-sort-value="0.75" | 750 m || 
|-id=556 bgcolor=#E9E9E9
| 469556 ||  || — || October 19, 2003 || Kitt Peak || Spacewatch || — || align=right | 2.0 km || 
|-id=557 bgcolor=#E9E9E9
| 469557 ||  || — || October 19, 2003 || Palomar || NEAT || — || align=right | 2.0 km || 
|-id=558 bgcolor=#E9E9E9
| 469558 ||  || — || October 18, 2003 || Anderson Mesa || LONEOS || — || align=right | 2.5 km || 
|-id=559 bgcolor=#E9E9E9
| 469559 ||  || — || September 22, 2003 || Kitt Peak || Spacewatch || — || align=right | 1.8 km || 
|-id=560 bgcolor=#E9E9E9
| 469560 ||  || — || October 22, 2003 || Kitt Peak || Spacewatch || — || align=right | 2.1 km || 
|-id=561 bgcolor=#E9E9E9
| 469561 ||  || — || September 20, 2003 || Campo Imperatore || CINEOS || — || align=right | 1.6 km || 
|-id=562 bgcolor=#E9E9E9
| 469562 ||  || — || October 16, 2003 || Kitt Peak || Spacewatch || — || align=right | 1.7 km || 
|-id=563 bgcolor=#d6d6d6
| 469563 ||  || — || October 18, 2003 || Apache Point || SDSS || ULA7:4 || align=right | 4.2 km || 
|-id=564 bgcolor=#E9E9E9
| 469564 ||  || — || October 22, 2003 || Apache Point || SDSS || — || align=right | 1.0 km || 
|-id=565 bgcolor=#FA8072
| 469565 ||  || — || November 15, 2003 || Kitt Peak || Spacewatch || — || align=right | 4.0 km || 
|-id=566 bgcolor=#E9E9E9
| 469566 ||  || — || November 15, 2003 || Kitt Peak || Spacewatch || — || align=right | 2.3 km || 
|-id=567 bgcolor=#E9E9E9
| 469567 ||  || — || November 15, 2003 || Palomar || NEAT || — || align=right | 2.7 km || 
|-id=568 bgcolor=#E9E9E9
| 469568 ||  || — || November 16, 2003 || Kitt Peak || Spacewatch || — || align=right | 2.1 km || 
|-id=569 bgcolor=#fefefe
| 469569 ||  || — || November 20, 2003 || Socorro || LINEAR || H || align=right data-sort-value="0.90" | 900 m || 
|-id=570 bgcolor=#E9E9E9
| 469570 ||  || — || October 18, 2003 || Kitt Peak || Spacewatch || — || align=right | 2.1 km || 
|-id=571 bgcolor=#E9E9E9
| 469571 ||  || — || November 19, 2003 || Palomar || NEAT || — || align=right | 2.6 km || 
|-id=572 bgcolor=#fefefe
| 469572 ||  || — || November 21, 2003 || Socorro || LINEAR || H || align=right data-sort-value="0.89" | 890 m || 
|-id=573 bgcolor=#E9E9E9
| 469573 ||  || — || November 19, 2003 || Anderson Mesa || LONEOS || — || align=right | 2.2 km || 
|-id=574 bgcolor=#E9E9E9
| 469574 ||  || — || November 21, 2003 || Palomar || NEAT || — || align=right | 2.5 km || 
|-id=575 bgcolor=#E9E9E9
| 469575 ||  || — || November 21, 2003 || Kitt Peak || Spacewatch || AGN || align=right data-sort-value="0.89" | 890 m || 
|-id=576 bgcolor=#E9E9E9
| 469576 ||  || — || October 24, 2003 || Socorro || LINEAR || — || align=right | 2.3 km || 
|-id=577 bgcolor=#E9E9E9
| 469577 ||  || — || November 20, 2003 || Socorro || LINEAR || — || align=right | 2.2 km || 
|-id=578 bgcolor=#E9E9E9
| 469578 ||  || — || November 24, 2003 || Kitt Peak || Spacewatch || DOR || align=right | 2.0 km || 
|-id=579 bgcolor=#fefefe
| 469579 ||  || — || December 17, 2003 || Socorro || LINEAR || H || align=right | 1.0 km || 
|-id=580 bgcolor=#E9E9E9
| 469580 ||  || — || November 19, 2003 || Socorro || LINEAR || — || align=right | 2.4 km || 
|-id=581 bgcolor=#E9E9E9
| 469581 ||  || — || December 19, 2003 || Socorro || LINEAR || — || align=right | 2.5 km || 
|-id=582 bgcolor=#fefefe
| 469582 ||  || — || December 1, 2003 || Socorro || LINEAR || — || align=right | 1.2 km || 
|-id=583 bgcolor=#E9E9E9
| 469583 ||  || — || December 29, 2003 || Catalina || CSS || — || align=right | 2.7 km || 
|-id=584 bgcolor=#C2E0FF
| 469584 ||  || — || December 24, 2003 || Mauna Kea || Mauna Kea Obs. || res3:5critical || align=right | 193 km || 
|-id=585 bgcolor=#fefefe
| 469585 ||  || — || January 15, 2004 || Kitt Peak || Spacewatch || H || align=right data-sort-value="0.90" | 900 m || 
|-id=586 bgcolor=#d6d6d6
| 469586 ||  || — || January 17, 2004 || Kitt Peak || Spacewatch || — || align=right | 3.2 km || 
|-id=587 bgcolor=#fefefe
| 469587 ||  || — || January 18, 2004 || Palomar || NEAT || H || align=right data-sort-value="0.90" | 900 m || 
|-id=588 bgcolor=#d6d6d6
| 469588 ||  || — || January 30, 2004 || Kitt Peak || Spacewatch || — || align=right | 2.8 km || 
|-id=589 bgcolor=#d6d6d6
| 469589 ||  || — || January 30, 2004 || Kitt Peak || Spacewatch || — || align=right | 3.1 km || 
|-id=590 bgcolor=#fefefe
| 469590 ||  || — || February 17, 2004 || Catalina || CSS || — || align=right data-sort-value="0.94" | 940 m || 
|-id=591 bgcolor=#d6d6d6
| 469591 ||  || — || February 17, 2004 || Catalina || CSS || Tj (2.99) || align=right | 1.7 km || 
|-id=592 bgcolor=#d6d6d6
| 469592 ||  || — || February 23, 2004 || Socorro || LINEAR || — || align=right | 2.3 km || 
|-id=593 bgcolor=#fefefe
| 469593 ||  || — || February 22, 2004 || Kitt Peak || M. W. Buie || H || align=right data-sort-value="0.76" | 760 m || 
|-id=594 bgcolor=#fefefe
| 469594 ||  || — || February 26, 2004 || Socorro || LINEAR || NYS || align=right data-sort-value="0.70" | 700 m || 
|-id=595 bgcolor=#E9E9E9
| 469595 ||  || — || February 25, 2004 || Socorro || LINEAR || ADE || align=right | 2.3 km || 
|-id=596 bgcolor=#fefefe
| 469596 ||  || — || March 14, 2004 || Kitt Peak || Spacewatch || — || align=right data-sort-value="0.61" | 610 m || 
|-id=597 bgcolor=#fefefe
| 469597 ||  || — || March 15, 2004 || Kitt Peak || Spacewatch || — || align=right data-sort-value="0.78" | 780 m || 
|-id=598 bgcolor=#fefefe
| 469598 ||  || — || March 17, 2004 || Kitt Peak || Spacewatch || — || align=right data-sort-value="0.82" | 820 m || 
|-id=599 bgcolor=#fefefe
| 469599 ||  || — || March 17, 2004 || Kitt Peak || Spacewatch || — || align=right data-sort-value="0.65" | 650 m || 
|-id=600 bgcolor=#fefefe
| 469600 ||  || — || March 20, 2004 || Socorro || LINEAR || — || align=right data-sort-value="0.86" | 860 m || 
|}

469601–469700 

|-bgcolor=#d6d6d6
| 469601 ||  || — || March 15, 2004 || Kitt Peak || Spacewatch || — || align=right | 3.3 km || 
|-id=602 bgcolor=#d6d6d6
| 469602 ||  || — || March 16, 2004 || Kitt Peak || Spacewatch || — || align=right | 2.3 km || 
|-id=603 bgcolor=#fefefe
| 469603 ||  || — || April 12, 2004 || Palomar || NEAT || — || align=right | 1.1 km || 
|-id=604 bgcolor=#fefefe
| 469604 ||  || — || April 12, 2004 || Siding Spring || SSS || — || align=right data-sort-value="0.96" | 960 m || 
|-id=605 bgcolor=#d6d6d6
| 469605 ||  || — || April 14, 2004 || Socorro || LINEAR || Tj (2.96) || align=right | 3.0 km || 
|-id=606 bgcolor=#d6d6d6
| 469606 ||  || — || April 12, 2004 || Kitt Peak || Spacewatch || EOS || align=right | 2.0 km || 
|-id=607 bgcolor=#fefefe
| 469607 ||  || — || April 13, 2004 || Kitt Peak || Spacewatch || — || align=right data-sort-value="0.69" | 690 m || 
|-id=608 bgcolor=#fefefe
| 469608 ||  || — || April 16, 2004 || Kitt Peak || Spacewatch || — || align=right data-sort-value="0.73" | 730 m || 
|-id=609 bgcolor=#d6d6d6
| 469609 ||  || — || April 22, 2004 || Apache Point || SDSS || — || align=right | 4.4 km || 
|-id=610 bgcolor=#C2E0FF
| 469610 ||  || — || April 24, 2004 || Mauna Kea || B. Gladman || cubewano (cold)mooncritical || align=right | 228 km || 
|-id=611 bgcolor=#fefefe
| 469611 ||  || — || May 12, 2004 || Anderson Mesa || LONEOS || critical || align=right data-sort-value="0.90" | 900 m || 
|-id=612 bgcolor=#d6d6d6
| 469612 ||  || — || May 28, 2004 || Socorro || LINEAR || Tj (2.96) || align=right | 1.9 km || 
|-id=613 bgcolor=#E9E9E9
| 469613 ||  || — || June 11, 2004 || Kitt Peak || Spacewatch || — || align=right data-sort-value="0.75" | 750 m || 
|-id=614 bgcolor=#fefefe
| 469614 ||  || — || July 15, 2004 || Siding Spring || SSS || — || align=right | 1.0 km || 
|-id=615 bgcolor=#C2E0FF
| 469615 ||  || — || August 13, 2004 || Cerro Tololo || M. W. Buie || other TNO || align=right | 261 km || 
|-id=616 bgcolor=#E9E9E9
| 469616 ||  || — || August 21, 2004 || Siding Spring || SSS || — || align=right data-sort-value="0.94" | 940 m || 
|-id=617 bgcolor=#E9E9E9
| 469617 ||  || — || August 23, 2004 || Kitt Peak || Spacewatch || — || align=right data-sort-value="0.81" | 810 m || 
|-id=618 bgcolor=#E9E9E9
| 469618 ||  || — || August 25, 2004 || Kitt Peak || Spacewatch || — || align=right data-sort-value="0.74" | 740 m || 
|-id=619 bgcolor=#E9E9E9
| 469619 ||  || — || September 8, 2004 || Campo Imperatore || CINEOS || — || align=right data-sort-value="0.93" | 930 m || 
|-id=620 bgcolor=#E9E9E9
| 469620 ||  || — || September 8, 2004 || Socorro || LINEAR || — || align=right | 1.3 km || 
|-id=621 bgcolor=#E9E9E9
| 469621 ||  || — || September 8, 2004 || Socorro || LINEAR || — || align=right data-sort-value="0.84" | 840 m || 
|-id=622 bgcolor=#E9E9E9
| 469622 ||  || — || September 10, 2004 || Socorro || LINEAR || — || align=right data-sort-value="0.63" | 630 m || 
|-id=623 bgcolor=#E9E9E9
| 469623 ||  || — || September 11, 2004 || Kitt Peak || Spacewatch || — || align=right data-sort-value="0.72" | 720 m || 
|-id=624 bgcolor=#E9E9E9
| 469624 ||  || — || September 7, 2004 || Kitt Peak || Spacewatch || — || align=right data-sort-value="0.67" | 670 m || 
|-id=625 bgcolor=#E9E9E9
| 469625 ||  || — || September 10, 2004 || Socorro || LINEAR || — || align=right | 1.1 km || 
|-id=626 bgcolor=#E9E9E9
| 469626 ||  || — || September 9, 2004 || Kitt Peak || Spacewatch || — || align=right | 1.3 km || 
|-id=627 bgcolor=#E9E9E9
| 469627 ||  || — || September 15, 2004 || Socorro || LINEAR || — || align=right | 2.3 km || 
|-id=628 bgcolor=#E9E9E9
| 469628 ||  || — || September 11, 2004 || Kitt Peak || Spacewatch || — || align=right data-sort-value="0.83" | 830 m || 
|-id=629 bgcolor=#E9E9E9
| 469629 ||  || — || September 11, 2004 || Kitt Peak || Spacewatch || (5)critical || align=right data-sort-value="0.64" | 640 m || 
|-id=630 bgcolor=#E9E9E9
| 469630 ||  || — || September 12, 2004 || Socorro || LINEAR || — || align=right | 2.3 km || 
|-id=631 bgcolor=#E9E9E9
| 469631 ||  || — || September 15, 2004 || Kitt Peak || Spacewatch || — || align=right data-sort-value="0.64" | 640 m || 
|-id=632 bgcolor=#E9E9E9
| 469632 ||  || — || September 15, 2004 || Kitt Peak || Spacewatch || (5) || align=right data-sort-value="0.74" | 740 m || 
|-id=633 bgcolor=#d6d6d6
| 469633 ||  || — || August 22, 2004 || Kitt Peak || Spacewatch || — || align=right | 2.4 km || 
|-id=634 bgcolor=#FFC2E0
| 469634 ||  || — || September 21, 2004 || Socorro || LINEAR || AMOcritical || align=right data-sort-value="0.51" | 510 m || 
|-id=635 bgcolor=#fefefe
| 469635 ||  || — || September 7, 2004 || Kitt Peak || Spacewatch || — || align=right data-sort-value="0.94" | 940 m || 
|-id=636 bgcolor=#E9E9E9
| 469636 ||  || — || September 22, 2004 || Goodricke-Pigott || R. A. Tucker || — || align=right | 1.4 km || 
|-id=637 bgcolor=#d6d6d6
| 469637 ||  || — || October 4, 2004 || Kitt Peak || Spacewatch || — || align=right | 3.2 km || 
|-id=638 bgcolor=#E9E9E9
| 469638 ||  || — || October 5, 2004 || Socorro || LINEAR || — || align=right data-sort-value="0.80" | 800 m || 
|-id=639 bgcolor=#E9E9E9
| 469639 ||  || — || October 10, 2004 || Pla D'Arguines || Pla D'Arguines Obs. || — || align=right | 2.6 km || 
|-id=640 bgcolor=#FA8072
| 469640 ||  || — || October 12, 2004 || Socorro || LINEAR || — || align=right data-sort-value="0.77" | 770 m || 
|-id=641 bgcolor=#d6d6d6
| 469641 ||  || — || September 9, 2004 || Kitt Peak || Spacewatch || — || align=right | 3.2 km || 
|-id=642 bgcolor=#E9E9E9
| 469642 ||  || — || September 9, 2004 || Campo Imperatore || CINEOS || JUN || align=right | 1.0 km || 
|-id=643 bgcolor=#fefefe
| 469643 ||  || — || October 5, 2004 || Kitt Peak || Spacewatch || — || align=right data-sort-value="0.77" | 770 m || 
|-id=644 bgcolor=#E9E9E9
| 469644 ||  || — || October 5, 2004 || Kitt Peak || Spacewatch || MRX || align=right data-sort-value="0.80" | 800 m || 
|-id=645 bgcolor=#E9E9E9
| 469645 ||  || — || October 5, 2004 || Kitt Peak || Spacewatch || EUN || align=right | 1.5 km || 
|-id=646 bgcolor=#d6d6d6
| 469646 ||  || — || October 5, 2004 || Kitt Peak || Spacewatch || KOR || align=right | 1.5 km || 
|-id=647 bgcolor=#E9E9E9
| 469647 ||  || — || September 7, 2004 || Kitt Peak || Spacewatch || — || align=right | 1.8 km || 
|-id=648 bgcolor=#E9E9E9
| 469648 ||  || — || October 6, 2004 || Kitt Peak || Spacewatch || — || align=right | 1.1 km || 
|-id=649 bgcolor=#d6d6d6
| 469649 ||  || — || September 15, 2004 || Kitt Peak || Spacewatch || — || align=right | 2.4 km || 
|-id=650 bgcolor=#E9E9E9
| 469650 ||  || — || September 13, 2004 || Socorro || LINEAR || — || align=right | 1.8 km || 
|-id=651 bgcolor=#d6d6d6
| 469651 ||  || — || October 4, 2004 || Kitt Peak || Spacewatch || — || align=right | 2.4 km || 
|-id=652 bgcolor=#d6d6d6
| 469652 ||  || — || September 23, 2004 || Kitt Peak || Spacewatch || — || align=right | 2.2 km || 
|-id=653 bgcolor=#E9E9E9
| 469653 ||  || — || October 6, 2004 || Kitt Peak || Spacewatch || — || align=right data-sort-value="0.77" | 770 m || 
|-id=654 bgcolor=#d6d6d6
| 469654 ||  || — || October 6, 2004 || Kitt Peak || Spacewatch || — || align=right | 2.8 km || 
|-id=655 bgcolor=#E9E9E9
| 469655 ||  || — || October 6, 2004 || Kitt Peak || Spacewatch || (5) || align=right data-sort-value="0.63" | 630 m || 
|-id=656 bgcolor=#E9E9E9
| 469656 ||  || — || October 6, 2004 || Kitt Peak || Spacewatch || (5) || align=right data-sort-value="0.72" | 720 m || 
|-id=657 bgcolor=#E9E9E9
| 469657 ||  || — || October 7, 2004 || Kitt Peak || Spacewatch || EUN || align=right data-sort-value="0.99" | 990 m || 
|-id=658 bgcolor=#fefefe
| 469658 ||  || — || September 22, 2004 || Desert Eagle || W. K. Y. Yeung || — || align=right data-sort-value="0.79" | 790 m || 
|-id=659 bgcolor=#fefefe
| 469659 ||  || — || October 7, 2004 || Kitt Peak || Spacewatch || — || align=right data-sort-value="0.85" | 850 m || 
|-id=660 bgcolor=#E9E9E9
| 469660 ||  || — || October 8, 2004 || Socorro || LINEAR || MAR || align=right | 1.6 km || 
|-id=661 bgcolor=#d6d6d6
| 469661 ||  || — || September 23, 2004 || Kitt Peak || Spacewatch || — || align=right | 1.9 km || 
|-id=662 bgcolor=#E9E9E9
| 469662 ||  || — || October 10, 2004 || Socorro || LINEAR || — || align=right | 1.0 km || 
|-id=663 bgcolor=#E9E9E9
| 469663 ||  || — || October 8, 2004 || Kitt Peak || Spacewatch || — || align=right data-sort-value="0.80" | 800 m || 
|-id=664 bgcolor=#fefefe
| 469664 ||  || — || October 11, 2004 || Kitt Peak || Spacewatch || NYS || align=right data-sort-value="0.79" | 790 m || 
|-id=665 bgcolor=#E9E9E9
| 469665 ||  || — || October 14, 2004 || Palomar || NEAT || — || align=right data-sort-value="0.87" | 870 m || 
|-id=666 bgcolor=#E9E9E9
| 469666 ||  || — || October 7, 2004 || Kitt Peak || Spacewatch || (5) || align=right data-sort-value="0.59" | 590 m || 
|-id=667 bgcolor=#E9E9E9
| 469667 ||  || — || October 13, 2004 || Kitt Peak || Spacewatch || — || align=right data-sort-value="0.96" | 960 m || 
|-id=668 bgcolor=#fefefe
| 469668 ||  || — || October 6, 2004 || Kitt Peak || Spacewatch || — || align=right data-sort-value="0.72" | 720 m || 
|-id=669 bgcolor=#E9E9E9
| 469669 ||  || — || November 3, 2004 || Anderson Mesa || LONEOS || — || align=right data-sort-value="0.81" | 810 m || 
|-id=670 bgcolor=#E9E9E9
| 469670 ||  || — || November 3, 2004 || Palomar || NEAT || (5) || align=right data-sort-value="0.80" | 800 m || 
|-id=671 bgcolor=#d6d6d6
| 469671 ||  || — || October 15, 2004 || Kitt Peak || Spacewatch || — || align=right | 3.3 km || 
|-id=672 bgcolor=#FA8072
| 469672 ||  || — || December 1, 2004 || Catalina || CSS || — || align=right | 1.5 km || 
|-id=673 bgcolor=#E9E9E9
| 469673 ||  || — || December 8, 2004 || Socorro || LINEAR || — || align=right | 1.2 km || 
|-id=674 bgcolor=#E9E9E9
| 469674 ||  || — || December 8, 2004 || Socorro || LINEAR || — || align=right | 1.0 km || 
|-id=675 bgcolor=#E9E9E9
| 469675 ||  || — || December 10, 2004 || Socorro || LINEAR || — || align=right | 1.8 km || 
|-id=676 bgcolor=#FA8072
| 469676 ||  || — || December 10, 2004 || Kitt Peak || Spacewatch || — || align=right | 2.7 km || 
|-id=677 bgcolor=#E9E9E9
| 469677 ||  || — || December 2, 2004 || Socorro || LINEAR || — || align=right | 1.1 km || 
|-id=678 bgcolor=#E9E9E9
| 469678 ||  || — || December 14, 2004 || Catalina || CSS || — || align=right | 2.1 km || 
|-id=679 bgcolor=#E9E9E9
| 469679 ||  || — || December 10, 2004 || Socorro || LINEAR || (5) || align=right data-sort-value="0.81" | 810 m || 
|-id=680 bgcolor=#E9E9E9
| 469680 ||  || — || December 11, 2004 || Socorro || LINEAR || — || align=right data-sort-value="0.98" | 980 m || 
|-id=681 bgcolor=#fefefe
| 469681 ||  || — || December 11, 2004 || Kitt Peak || Spacewatch || — || align=right data-sort-value="0.80" | 800 m || 
|-id=682 bgcolor=#E9E9E9
| 469682 ||  || — || December 9, 2004 || Kitt Peak || Spacewatch || — || align=right | 1.4 km || 
|-id=683 bgcolor=#E9E9E9
| 469683 ||  || — || December 15, 2004 || Socorro || LINEAR || — || align=right | 1.2 km || 
|-id=684 bgcolor=#d6d6d6
| 469684 ||  || — || November 4, 2004 || Catalina || CSS || — || align=right | 3.3 km || 
|-id=685 bgcolor=#E9E9E9
| 469685 ||  || — || December 9, 2004 || Catalina || CSS || (1547) || align=right | 1.7 km || 
|-id=686 bgcolor=#E9E9E9
| 469686 ||  || — || November 9, 2004 || Catalina || CSS || — || align=right | 2.1 km || 
|-id=687 bgcolor=#E9E9E9
| 469687 ||  || — || December 18, 2004 || Mount Lemmon || Mount Lemmon Survey || — || align=right | 2.4 km || 
|-id=688 bgcolor=#E9E9E9
| 469688 ||  || — || January 6, 2005 || Catalina || CSS || — || align=right | 2.1 km || 
|-id=689 bgcolor=#fefefe
| 469689 ||  || — || January 6, 2005 || Socorro || LINEAR || — || align=right | 1.2 km || 
|-id=690 bgcolor=#fefefe
| 469690 ||  || — || January 13, 2005 || Kitt Peak || Spacewatch || H || align=right data-sort-value="0.62" | 620 m || 
|-id=691 bgcolor=#E9E9E9
| 469691 ||  || — || January 15, 2005 || Kitt Peak || Spacewatch || — || align=right | 2.3 km || 
|-id=692 bgcolor=#E9E9E9
| 469692 ||  || — || January 15, 2005 || Kitt Peak || Spacewatch || — || align=right | 1.6 km || 
|-id=693 bgcolor=#E9E9E9
| 469693 ||  || — || December 20, 2004 || Mount Lemmon || Mount Lemmon Survey || EUN || align=right | 1.5 km || 
|-id=694 bgcolor=#E9E9E9
| 469694 ||  || — || January 17, 2005 || Catalina || CSS || — || align=right | 1.7 km || 
|-id=695 bgcolor=#E9E9E9
| 469695 ||  || — || January 13, 2005 || Kitt Peak || Spacewatch || — || align=right | 2.4 km || 
|-id=696 bgcolor=#FA8072
| 469696 ||  || — || February 9, 2005 || Anderson Mesa || LONEOS || — || align=right | 2.6 km || 
|-id=697 bgcolor=#fefefe
| 469697 ||  || — || February 1, 2005 || Kitt Peak || Spacewatch || — || align=right data-sort-value="0.98" | 980 m || 
|-id=698 bgcolor=#fefefe
| 469698 ||  || — || March 4, 2005 || Socorro || LINEAR || H || align=right data-sort-value="0.83" | 830 m || 
|-id=699 bgcolor=#FA8072
| 469699 ||  || — || March 7, 2005 || Socorro || LINEAR || — || align=right | 2.0 km || 
|-id=700 bgcolor=#d6d6d6
| 469700 ||  || — || March 11, 2005 || Mount Lemmon || Mount Lemmon Survey || KOR || align=right | 1.4 km || 
|}

469701–469800 

|-bgcolor=#fefefe
| 469701 ||  || — || March 13, 2005 || Catalina || CSS || H || align=right data-sort-value="0.82" | 820 m || 
|-id=702 bgcolor=#E9E9E9
| 469702 ||  || — || March 1, 2005 || Kitt Peak || Spacewatch || — || align=right | 1.7 km || 
|-id=703 bgcolor=#fefefe
| 469703 ||  || — || March 3, 2005 || Kitt Peak || Spacewatch || — || align=right data-sort-value="0.68" | 680 m || 
|-id=704 bgcolor=#C2E0FF
| 469704 ||  || — || March 9, 2005 || Kitt Peak || M. W. Buie || plutinocritical || align=right | 166 km || 
|-id=705 bgcolor=#C2E0FF
| 469705 ǂKá̦gára ||  ||  || March 11, 2005 || Kitt Peak || M. W. Buie || cubewano (cold)moon || align=right | 260 km || 
|-id=706 bgcolor=#fefefe
| 469706 ||  || — || April 6, 2005 || Mount Lemmon || Mount Lemmon Survey || — || align=right data-sort-value="0.62" | 620 m || 
|-id=707 bgcolor=#C2E0FF
| 469707 ||  || — || April 10, 2005 || Kitt Peak || M. W. Buie || plutinocritical || align=right | 158 km || 
|-id=708 bgcolor=#C2E0FF
| 469708 ||  || — || April 12, 2005 || Kitt Peak || M. W. Buie || plutinocritical || align=right | 136 km || 
|-id=709 bgcolor=#d6d6d6
| 469709 ||  || — || May 4, 2005 || Mauna Kea || C. Veillet || KOR || align=right | 1.2 km || 
|-id=710 bgcolor=#fefefe
| 469710 ||  || — || April 1, 2005 || Catalina || CSS || — || align=right data-sort-value="0.91" | 910 m || 
|-id=711 bgcolor=#fefefe
| 469711 ||  || — || May 4, 2005 || Kitt Peak || Spacewatch || — || align=right data-sort-value="0.73" | 730 m || 
|-id=712 bgcolor=#d6d6d6
| 469712 ||  || — || May 4, 2005 || Mount Lemmon || Mount Lemmon Survey || KOR || align=right | 1.3 km || 
|-id=713 bgcolor=#d6d6d6
| 469713 ||  || — || May 6, 2005 || Kitt Peak || Spacewatch || — || align=right | 3.0 km || 
|-id=714 bgcolor=#d6d6d6
| 469714 ||  || — || May 11, 2005 || Kitt Peak || Spacewatch || — || align=right | 2.2 km || 
|-id=715 bgcolor=#d6d6d6
| 469715 ||  || — || May 13, 2005 || Kitt Peak || Spacewatch || — || align=right | 1.5 km || 
|-id=716 bgcolor=#E9E9E9
| 469716 ||  || — || April 2, 2005 || Kitt Peak || Spacewatch ||  || align=right | 2.9 km || 
|-id=717 bgcolor=#fefefe
| 469717 ||  || — || May 12, 2005 || Campo Imperatore || CINEOS || — || align=right data-sort-value="0.75" | 750 m || 
|-id=718 bgcolor=#fefefe
| 469718 ||  || — || June 3, 2005 || Kitt Peak || Spacewatch || critical || align=right data-sort-value="0.47" | 470 m || 
|-id=719 bgcolor=#fefefe
| 469719 ||  || — || May 16, 2005 || Mount Lemmon || Mount Lemmon Survey || — || align=right data-sort-value="0.76" | 760 m || 
|-id=720 bgcolor=#fefefe
| 469720 ||  || — || June 8, 2005 || Kitt Peak || Spacewatch || NYS || align=right data-sort-value="0.58" | 580 m || 
|-id=721 bgcolor=#fefefe
| 469721 ||  || — || May 3, 2005 || Kitt Peak || Spacewatch || — || align=right data-sort-value="0.65" | 650 m || 
|-id=722 bgcolor=#FFC2E0
| 469722 ||  || — || June 14, 2005 || Socorro || LINEAR || APOcritical || align=right data-sort-value="0.45" | 450 m || 
|-id=723 bgcolor=#fefefe
| 469723 ||  || — || June 13, 2005 || Mount Lemmon || Mount Lemmon Survey || V || align=right data-sort-value="0.64" | 640 m || 
|-id=724 bgcolor=#d6d6d6
| 469724 ||  || — || June 27, 2005 || Palomar || NEAT || Tj (2.99) || align=right | 2.7 km || 
|-id=725 bgcolor=#fefefe
| 469725 ||  || — || June 17, 2005 || Mount Lemmon || Mount Lemmon Survey || NYScritical || align=right data-sort-value="0.55" | 550 m || 
|-id=726 bgcolor=#d6d6d6
| 469726 ||  || — || June 29, 2005 || Palomar || NEAT || — || align=right | 2.8 km || 
|-id=727 bgcolor=#FFC2E0
| 469727 ||  || — || July 3, 2005 || Mount Lemmon || Mount Lemmon Survey || APO +1km || align=right | 1.3 km || 
|-id=728 bgcolor=#d6d6d6
| 469728 ||  || — || June 18, 2005 || Mount Lemmon || Mount Lemmon Survey || — || align=right | 3.1 km || 
|-id=729 bgcolor=#d6d6d6
| 469729 ||  || — || June 18, 2005 || Mount Lemmon || Mount Lemmon Survey || — || align=right | 2.3 km || 
|-id=730 bgcolor=#fefefe
| 469730 ||  || — || July 1, 2005 || Kitt Peak || Spacewatch || V || align=right data-sort-value="0.78" | 780 m || 
|-id=731 bgcolor=#fefefe
| 469731 ||  || — || July 3, 2005 || Mount Lemmon || Mount Lemmon Survey || MAS || align=right data-sort-value="0.68" | 680 m || 
|-id=732 bgcolor=#fefefe
| 469732 ||  || — || July 1, 2005 || Kitt Peak || Spacewatch || — || align=right data-sort-value="0.68" | 680 m || 
|-id=733 bgcolor=#fefefe
| 469733 ||  || — || July 4, 2005 || Kitt Peak || Spacewatch || — || align=right data-sort-value="0.76" | 760 m || 
|-id=734 bgcolor=#d6d6d6
| 469734 ||  || — || June 13, 2005 || Mount Lemmon || Mount Lemmon Survey || — || align=right | 2.9 km || 
|-id=735 bgcolor=#d6d6d6
| 469735 ||  || — || July 5, 2005 || Kitt Peak || Spacewatch || — || align=right | 2.0 km || 
|-id=736 bgcolor=#d6d6d6
| 469736 ||  || — || July 5, 2005 || Kitt Peak || Spacewatch || — || align=right | 2.5 km || 
|-id=737 bgcolor=#FFC2E0
| 469737 ||  || — || July 10, 2005 || Catalina || CSS || ATE || align=right data-sort-value="0.30" | 300 m || 
|-id=738 bgcolor=#fefefe
| 469738 ||  || — || July 10, 2005 || Kitt Peak || Spacewatch || — || align=right data-sort-value="0.56" | 560 m || 
|-id=739 bgcolor=#d6d6d6
| 469739 ||  || — || July 6, 2005 || Kitt Peak || Spacewatch || — || align=right | 2.1 km || 
|-id=740 bgcolor=#d6d6d6
| 469740 ||  || — || June 18, 2005 || Mount Lemmon || Mount Lemmon Survey || EOS || align=right | 1.7 km || 
|-id=741 bgcolor=#fefefe
| 469741 ||  || — || July 12, 2005 || Mount Lemmon || Mount Lemmon Survey || MAS || align=right data-sort-value="0.71" | 710 m || 
|-id=742 bgcolor=#d6d6d6
| 469742 ||  || — || July 7, 2005 || Mauna Kea || C. Veillet || — || align=right | 2.1 km || 
|-id=743 bgcolor=#d6d6d6
| 469743 ||  || — || July 7, 2005 || Mauna Kea || C. Veillet || EOS || align=right | 1.8 km || 
|-id=744 bgcolor=#d6d6d6
| 469744 ||  || — || July 7, 2005 || Mauna Kea || C. Veillet || — || align=right | 1.9 km || 
|-id=745 bgcolor=#d6d6d6
| 469745 ||  || — || July 29, 2005 || Socorro || LINEAR || — || align=right | 4.4 km || 
|-id=746 bgcolor=#d6d6d6
| 469746 ||  || — || July 28, 2005 || Palomar || NEAT || — || align=right | 3.1 km || 
|-id=747 bgcolor=#d6d6d6
| 469747 ||  || — || August 6, 2005 || Siding Spring || SSS || Tj (2.96) || align=right | 5.4 km || 
|-id=748 bgcolor=#fefefe
| 469748 Volnay ||  ||  || August 9, 2005 || Vicques || M. Ory || — || align=right data-sort-value="0.85" | 850 m || 
|-id=749 bgcolor=#fefefe
| 469749 ||  || — || August 10, 2005 || Saint-Sulpice || Saint-Sulpice Obs. || MAS || align=right data-sort-value="0.58" | 580 m || 
|-id=750 bgcolor=#C2E0FF
| 469750 ||  || — || August 9, 2005 || Cerro Tololo || Cerro Tololo Obs. || centaur || align=right | 223 km || 
|-id=751 bgcolor=#d6d6d6
| 469751 ||  || — || August 24, 2005 || Palomar || NEAT || — || align=right | 2.5 km || 
|-id=752 bgcolor=#fefefe
| 469752 ||  || — || August 25, 2005 || Campo Imperatore || CINEOS || MAS || align=right data-sort-value="0.67" | 670 m || 
|-id=753 bgcolor=#d6d6d6
| 469753 ||  || — || August 24, 2005 || Palomar || NEAT || — || align=right | 2.8 km || 
|-id=754 bgcolor=#fefefe
| 469754 ||  || — || August 24, 2005 || Palomar || NEAT || — || align=right data-sort-value="0.67" | 670 m || 
|-id=755 bgcolor=#fefefe
| 469755 ||  || — || August 26, 2005 || Anderson Mesa || LONEOS || NYS || align=right data-sort-value="0.82" | 820 m || 
|-id=756 bgcolor=#fefefe
| 469756 ||  || — || August 26, 2005 || Campo Imperatore || CINEOS || NYS || align=right data-sort-value="0.70" | 700 m || 
|-id=757 bgcolor=#d6d6d6
| 469757 ||  || — || August 27, 2005 || Kitt Peak || Spacewatch || — || align=right | 2.6 km || 
|-id=758 bgcolor=#d6d6d6
| 469758 ||  || — || August 28, 2005 || Vicques || M. Ory || — || align=right | 4.5 km || 
|-id=759 bgcolor=#fefefe
| 469759 ||  || — || August 26, 2005 || Palomar || NEAT || — || align=right data-sort-value="0.69" | 690 m || 
|-id=760 bgcolor=#fefefe
| 469760 ||  || — || August 25, 2005 || Palomar || NEAT || — || align=right data-sort-value="0.69" | 690 m || 
|-id=761 bgcolor=#d6d6d6
| 469761 ||  || — || August 26, 2005 || Anderson Mesa || LONEOS || — || align=right | 4.8 km || 
|-id=762 bgcolor=#fefefe
| 469762 ||  || — || August 26, 2005 || Palomar || NEAT || — || align=right data-sort-value="0.64" | 640 m || 
|-id=763 bgcolor=#fefefe
| 469763 ||  || — || August 26, 2005 || Palomar || NEAT || — || align=right data-sort-value="0.79" | 790 m || 
|-id=764 bgcolor=#fefefe
| 469764 ||  || — || June 17, 2005 || Mount Lemmon || Mount Lemmon Survey || — || align=right data-sort-value="0.69" | 690 m || 
|-id=765 bgcolor=#fefefe
| 469765 ||  || — || August 26, 2005 || Palomar || NEAT || — || align=right data-sort-value="0.77" | 770 m || 
|-id=766 bgcolor=#fefefe
| 469766 ||  || — || August 26, 2005 || Palomar || NEAT || MAS || align=right data-sort-value="0.68" | 680 m || 
|-id=767 bgcolor=#fefefe
| 469767 ||  || — || August 26, 2005 || Palomar || NEAT || — || align=right data-sort-value="0.85" | 850 m || 
|-id=768 bgcolor=#d6d6d6
| 469768 ||  || — || August 26, 2005 || Palomar || NEAT || — || align=right | 3.6 km || 
|-id=769 bgcolor=#fefefe
| 469769 ||  || — || August 28, 2005 || Kitt Peak || Spacewatch || — || align=right data-sort-value="0.96" | 960 m || 
|-id=770 bgcolor=#d6d6d6
| 469770 ||  || — || July 6, 2005 || Kitt Peak || Spacewatch || critical || align=right | 2.5 km || 
|-id=771 bgcolor=#fefefe
| 469771 ||  || — || August 28, 2005 || Siding Spring || SSS || — || align=right data-sort-value="0.62" | 620 m || 
|-id=772 bgcolor=#d6d6d6
| 469772 ||  || — || August 29, 2005 || Socorro || LINEAR || — || align=right | 2.9 km || 
|-id=773 bgcolor=#fefefe
| 469773 Kitaibel ||  ||  || August 30, 2005 || Piszkéstető || K. Sárneczky, Z. Kuli || — || align=right data-sort-value="0.78" | 780 m || 
|-id=774 bgcolor=#d6d6d6
| 469774 ||  || — || August 29, 2005 || Kitt Peak || Spacewatch || — || align=right | 2.3 km || 
|-id=775 bgcolor=#fefefe
| 469775 ||  || — || August 29, 2005 || Anderson Mesa || LONEOS || — || align=right data-sort-value="0.85" | 850 m || 
|-id=776 bgcolor=#d6d6d6
| 469776 ||  || — || August 25, 2005 || Palomar || NEAT || THM || align=right | 2.7 km || 
|-id=777 bgcolor=#fefefe
| 469777 ||  || — || August 28, 2005 || Kitt Peak || Spacewatch || MAS || align=right data-sort-value="0.71" | 710 m || 
|-id=778 bgcolor=#fefefe
| 469778 ||  || — || August 28, 2005 || Kitt Peak || Spacewatch || NYS || align=right data-sort-value="0.61" | 610 m || 
|-id=779 bgcolor=#d6d6d6
| 469779 ||  || — || August 28, 2005 || Kitt Peak || Spacewatch || — || align=right | 2.4 km || 
|-id=780 bgcolor=#d6d6d6
| 469780 ||  || — || August 28, 2005 || Kitt Peak || Spacewatch || — || align=right | 2.2 km || 
|-id=781 bgcolor=#fefefe
| 469781 ||  || — || August 28, 2005 || Kitt Peak || Spacewatch || MAS || align=right data-sort-value="0.62" | 620 m || 
|-id=782 bgcolor=#fefefe
| 469782 ||  || — || August 28, 2005 || Kitt Peak || Spacewatch || MAS || align=right data-sort-value="0.59" | 590 m || 
|-id=783 bgcolor=#d6d6d6
| 469783 ||  || — || August 30, 2005 || Palomar || NEAT || — || align=right | 3.2 km || 
|-id=784 bgcolor=#fefefe
| 469784 ||  || — || August 30, 2005 || Kitt Peak || Spacewatch || NYS || align=right data-sort-value="0.63" | 630 m || 
|-id=785 bgcolor=#d6d6d6
| 469785 ||  || — || August 29, 2005 || Palomar || NEAT || — || align=right | 3.1 km || 
|-id=786 bgcolor=#fefefe
| 469786 ||  || — || August 31, 2005 || Kitt Peak || Spacewatch || NYS || align=right data-sort-value="0.70" | 700 m || 
|-id=787 bgcolor=#d6d6d6
| 469787 ||  || — || August 30, 2005 || Kitt Peak || Spacewatch || — || align=right | 3.2 km || 
|-id=788 bgcolor=#fefefe
| 469788 ||  || — || August 30, 2005 || Kitt Peak || Spacewatch || MAS || align=right data-sort-value="0.67" | 670 m || 
|-id=789 bgcolor=#fefefe
| 469789 ||  || — || September 1, 2005 || Palomar || NEAT || — || align=right data-sort-value="0.85" | 850 m || 
|-id=790 bgcolor=#fefefe
| 469790 ||  || — || September 7, 2005 || Wildberg || R. Apitzsch || H || align=right data-sort-value="0.68" | 680 m || 
|-id=791 bgcolor=#d6d6d6
| 469791 ||  || — || August 29, 2005 || Kitt Peak || Spacewatch || THB || align=right | 3.3 km || 
|-id=792 bgcolor=#fefefe
| 469792 ||  || — || August 30, 2005 || Socorro || LINEAR || — || align=right data-sort-value="0.91" | 910 m || 
|-id=793 bgcolor=#fefefe
| 469793 ||  || — || September 1, 2005 || Kitt Peak || Spacewatch || — || align=right | 1.7 km || 
|-id=794 bgcolor=#d6d6d6
| 469794 ||  || — || September 13, 2005 || Socorro || LINEAR || — || align=right | 4.1 km || 
|-id=795 bgcolor=#fefefe
| 469795 ||  || — || September 14, 2005 || Apache Point || A. C. Becker || — || align=right data-sort-value="0.89" | 890 m || 
|-id=796 bgcolor=#FA8072
| 469796 ||  || — || September 16, 2005 || Socorro || LINEAR || Tj (2.92) || align=right | 3.4 km || 
|-id=797 bgcolor=#fefefe
| 469797 ||  || — || September 23, 2005 || Kitt Peak || Spacewatch || NYS || align=right data-sort-value="0.56" | 560 m || 
|-id=798 bgcolor=#fefefe
| 469798 ||  || — || September 11, 2005 || Socorro || LINEAR || — || align=right data-sort-value="0.84" | 840 m || 
|-id=799 bgcolor=#fefefe
| 469799 ||  || — || September 26, 2005 || Kitt Peak || Spacewatch || — || align=right data-sort-value="0.69" | 690 m || 
|-id=800 bgcolor=#d6d6d6
| 469800 ||  || — || August 31, 2005 || Palomar || NEAT || fast? || align=right | 3.0 km || 
|}

469801–469900 

|-bgcolor=#fefefe
| 469801 ||  || — || September 24, 2005 || Kitt Peak || Spacewatch || — || align=right data-sort-value="0.75" | 750 m || 
|-id=802 bgcolor=#d6d6d6
| 469802 ||  || — || September 24, 2005 || Kitt Peak || Spacewatch || — || align=right | 3.1 km || 
|-id=803 bgcolor=#fefefe
| 469803 ||  || — || September 25, 2005 || Kitt Peak || Spacewatch || — || align=right | 1.4 km || 
|-id=804 bgcolor=#d6d6d6
| 469804 ||  || — || September 26, 2005 || Palomar || NEAT || — || align=right | 3.2 km || 
|-id=805 bgcolor=#fefefe
| 469805 ||  || — || September 24, 2005 || Kitt Peak || Spacewatch || — || align=right data-sort-value="0.67" | 670 m || 
|-id=806 bgcolor=#d6d6d6
| 469806 ||  || — || September 24, 2005 || Kitt Peak || Spacewatch || — || align=right | 2.3 km || 
|-id=807 bgcolor=#fefefe
| 469807 ||  || — || September 24, 2005 || Kitt Peak || Spacewatch || — || align=right data-sort-value="0.78" | 780 m || 
|-id=808 bgcolor=#fefefe
| 469808 ||  || — || September 24, 2005 || Kitt Peak || Spacewatch || NYS || align=right data-sort-value="0.68" | 680 m || 
|-id=809 bgcolor=#fefefe
| 469809 ||  || — || September 24, 2005 || Kitt Peak || Spacewatch || — || align=right data-sort-value="0.83" | 830 m || 
|-id=810 bgcolor=#d6d6d6
| 469810 ||  || — || September 3, 2005 || Catalina || CSS || TIR || align=right | 2.9 km || 
|-id=811 bgcolor=#fefefe
| 469811 ||  || — || September 27, 2005 || Kitt Peak || Spacewatch || NYS || align=right data-sort-value="0.65" | 650 m || 
|-id=812 bgcolor=#fefefe
| 469812 ||  || — || September 28, 2005 || Palomar || NEAT || — || align=right data-sort-value="0.69" | 690 m || 
|-id=813 bgcolor=#fefefe
| 469813 ||  || — || September 29, 2005 || Kitt Peak || Spacewatch || — || align=right data-sort-value="0.76" | 760 m || 
|-id=814 bgcolor=#d6d6d6
| 469814 ||  || — || September 25, 2005 || Kitt Peak || Spacewatch || — || align=right | 2.2 km || 
|-id=815 bgcolor=#d6d6d6
| 469815 ||  || — || September 25, 2005 || Kitt Peak || Spacewatch || — || align=right | 4.0 km || 
|-id=816 bgcolor=#d6d6d6
| 469816 ||  || — || September 25, 2005 || Kitt Peak || Spacewatch || — || align=right | 2.2 km || 
|-id=817 bgcolor=#fefefe
| 469817 ||  || — || September 25, 2005 || Kitt Peak || Spacewatch || MAS || align=right data-sort-value="0.58" | 580 m || 
|-id=818 bgcolor=#fefefe
| 469818 ||  || — || September 26, 2005 || Palomar || NEAT || NYS || align=right data-sort-value="0.53" | 530 m || 
|-id=819 bgcolor=#d6d6d6
| 469819 ||  || — || September 27, 2005 || Kitt Peak || Spacewatch || EOS || align=right | 2.0 km || 
|-id=820 bgcolor=#fefefe
| 469820 ||  || — || September 27, 2005 || Kitt Peak || Spacewatch || — || align=right data-sort-value="0.64" | 640 m || 
|-id=821 bgcolor=#fefefe
| 469821 ||  || — || September 29, 2005 || Kitt Peak || Spacewatch || NYS || align=right | 1.9 km || 
|-id=822 bgcolor=#fefefe
| 469822 ||  || — || September 29, 2005 || Mount Lemmon || Mount Lemmon Survey || MAS || align=right data-sort-value="0.71" | 710 m || 
|-id=823 bgcolor=#fefefe
| 469823 ||  || — || September 29, 2005 || Mount Lemmon || Mount Lemmon Survey || — || align=right data-sort-value="0.75" | 750 m || 
|-id=824 bgcolor=#d6d6d6
| 469824 ||  || — || September 30, 2005 || Kitt Peak || Spacewatch || — || align=right | 2.5 km || 
|-id=825 bgcolor=#fefefe
| 469825 ||  || — || September 30, 2005 || Palomar || NEAT || — || align=right | 1.3 km || 
|-id=826 bgcolor=#fefefe
| 469826 ||  || — || September 30, 2005 || Palomar || NEAT || MAS || align=right data-sort-value="0.75" | 750 m || 
|-id=827 bgcolor=#d6d6d6
| 469827 ||  || — || August 31, 2005 || Kitt Peak || Spacewatch || TIR || align=right | 2.9 km || 
|-id=828 bgcolor=#d6d6d6
| 469828 ||  || — || September 30, 2005 || Kitt Peak || Spacewatch || THM || align=right | 2.3 km || 
|-id=829 bgcolor=#fefefe
| 469829 ||  || — || September 30, 2005 || Mount Lemmon || Mount Lemmon Survey || — || align=right data-sort-value="0.70" | 700 m || 
|-id=830 bgcolor=#fefefe
| 469830 ||  || — || September 29, 2005 || Mount Lemmon || Mount Lemmon Survey || NYS || align=right data-sort-value="0.68" | 680 m || 
|-id=831 bgcolor=#d6d6d6
| 469831 ||  || — || September 29, 2005 || Kitt Peak || Spacewatch || EOS || align=right | 4.7 km || 
|-id=832 bgcolor=#fefefe
| 469832 ||  || — || September 30, 2005 || Kitt Peak || Spacewatch || — || align=right data-sort-value="0.59" | 590 m || 
|-id=833 bgcolor=#d6d6d6
| 469833 ||  || — || September 30, 2005 || Kitt Peak || Spacewatch || — || align=right | 3.0 km || 
|-id=834 bgcolor=#FA8072
| 469834 ||  || — || September 27, 2005 || Socorro || LINEAR || — || align=right data-sort-value="0.79" | 790 m || 
|-id=835 bgcolor=#fefefe
| 469835 ||  || — || September 23, 2005 || Catalina || CSS || — || align=right data-sort-value="0.69" | 690 m || 
|-id=836 bgcolor=#fefefe
| 469836 ||  || — || September 22, 2005 || Palomar || NEAT || MAS || align=right data-sort-value="0.76" | 760 m || 
|-id=837 bgcolor=#fefefe
| 469837 ||  || — || September 27, 2005 || Kitt Peak || Spacewatch || — || align=right data-sort-value="0.64" | 640 m || 
|-id=838 bgcolor=#d6d6d6
| 469838 ||  || — || October 1, 2005 || Kitt Peak || Spacewatch || criticalTj (2.99) || align=right | 3.6 km || 
|-id=839 bgcolor=#d6d6d6
| 469839 ||  || — || October 1, 2005 || Catalina || CSS || — || align=right | 3.5 km || 
|-id=840 bgcolor=#fefefe
| 469840 ||  || — || October 1, 2005 || Catalina || CSS || — || align=right data-sort-value="0.88" | 880 m || 
|-id=841 bgcolor=#E9E9E9
| 469841 ||  || — || August 9, 2000 || Kitt Peak || Spacewatch || — || align=right | 1.9 km || 
|-id=842 bgcolor=#fefefe
| 469842 ||  || — || October 5, 2005 || Socorro || LINEAR || MAS || align=right data-sort-value="0.69" | 690 m || 
|-id=843 bgcolor=#fefefe
| 469843 ||  || — || October 5, 2005 || Socorro || LINEAR || — || align=right data-sort-value="0.73" | 730 m || 
|-id=844 bgcolor=#d6d6d6
| 469844 ||  || — || October 5, 2005 || Kitt Peak || Spacewatch || — || align=right | 2.6 km || 
|-id=845 bgcolor=#E9E9E9
| 469845 ||  || — || October 6, 2005 || Mount Lemmon || Mount Lemmon Survey || — || align=right | 2.4 km || 
|-id=846 bgcolor=#fefefe
| 469846 ||  || — || September 24, 2005 || Kitt Peak || Spacewatch || — || align=right data-sort-value="0.74" | 740 m || 
|-id=847 bgcolor=#fefefe
| 469847 ||  || — || October 7, 2005 || Kitt Peak || Spacewatch || — || align=right data-sort-value="0.75" | 750 m || 
|-id=848 bgcolor=#fefefe
| 469848 ||  || — || October 3, 2005 || Kitt Peak || Spacewatch || — || align=right data-sort-value="0.77" | 770 m || 
|-id=849 bgcolor=#fefefe
| 469849 ||  || — || October 7, 2005 || Kitt Peak || Spacewatch || — || align=right data-sort-value="0.71" | 710 m || 
|-id=850 bgcolor=#fefefe
| 469850 ||  || — || October 7, 2005 || Kitt Peak || Spacewatch || — || align=right data-sort-value="0.68" | 680 m || 
|-id=851 bgcolor=#d6d6d6
| 469851 ||  || — || September 29, 2005 || Mount Lemmon || Mount Lemmon Survey || THM || align=right | 2.1 km || 
|-id=852 bgcolor=#d6d6d6
| 469852 ||  || — || October 10, 2005 || Kitt Peak || Spacewatch || — || align=right | 3.1 km || 
|-id=853 bgcolor=#fefefe
| 469853 ||  || — || October 1, 2005 || Anderson Mesa || LONEOS || — || align=right data-sort-value="0.82" | 820 m || 
|-id=854 bgcolor=#fefefe
| 469854 ||  || — || October 1, 2005 || Mount Lemmon || Mount Lemmon Survey || — || align=right data-sort-value="0.68" | 680 m || 
|-id=855 bgcolor=#fefefe
| 469855 ||  || — || October 21, 2005 || Palomar || NEAT || (5026) || align=right | 1.8 km || 
|-id=856 bgcolor=#fefefe
| 469856 ||  || — || October 22, 2005 || Kitt Peak || Spacewatch || MAS || align=right data-sort-value="0.65" | 650 m || 
|-id=857 bgcolor=#d6d6d6
| 469857 ||  || — || October 22, 2005 || Kitt Peak || Spacewatch || — || align=right | 5.2 km || 
|-id=858 bgcolor=#d6d6d6
| 469858 ||  || — || October 22, 2005 || Kitt Peak || Spacewatch || — || align=right | 3.5 km || 
|-id=859 bgcolor=#fefefe
| 469859 ||  || — || September 26, 2005 || Kitt Peak || Spacewatch || — || align=right data-sort-value="0.82" | 820 m || 
|-id=860 bgcolor=#d6d6d6
| 469860 ||  || — || October 10, 2005 || Kitt Peak || Spacewatch || EOS || align=right | 2.0 km || 
|-id=861 bgcolor=#fefefe
| 469861 ||  || — || October 23, 2005 || Kitt Peak || Spacewatch || — || align=right data-sort-value="0.72" | 720 m || 
|-id=862 bgcolor=#fefefe
| 469862 ||  || — || October 23, 2005 || Kitt Peak || Spacewatch || NYS || align=right data-sort-value="0.65" | 650 m || 
|-id=863 bgcolor=#d6d6d6
| 469863 ||  || — || October 5, 2005 || Kitt Peak || Spacewatch || — || align=right | 3.1 km || 
|-id=864 bgcolor=#d6d6d6
| 469864 ||  || — || October 24, 2005 || Kitt Peak || Spacewatch || — || align=right | 2.2 km || 
|-id=865 bgcolor=#fefefe
| 469865 ||  || — || October 22, 2005 || Kitt Peak || Spacewatch || — || align=right data-sort-value="0.84" | 840 m || 
|-id=866 bgcolor=#d6d6d6
| 469866 ||  || — || October 22, 2005 || Kitt Peak || Spacewatch || — || align=right | 4.6 km || 
|-id=867 bgcolor=#fefefe
| 469867 ||  || — || October 22, 2005 || Kitt Peak || Spacewatch || — || align=right data-sort-value="0.71" | 710 m || 
|-id=868 bgcolor=#d6d6d6
| 469868 ||  || — || October 23, 2005 || Catalina || CSS || — || align=right | 3.6 km || 
|-id=869 bgcolor=#fefefe
| 469869 ||  || — || September 25, 2005 || Kitt Peak || Spacewatch || NYS || align=right data-sort-value="0.78" | 780 m || 
|-id=870 bgcolor=#fefefe
| 469870 ||  || — || October 25, 2005 || Mount Lemmon || Mount Lemmon Survey || — || align=right data-sort-value="0.78" | 780 m || 
|-id=871 bgcolor=#d6d6d6
| 469871 ||  || — || October 24, 2005 || Palomar || NEAT || — || align=right | 4.0 km || 
|-id=872 bgcolor=#d6d6d6
| 469872 ||  || — || October 25, 2005 || Mount Lemmon || Mount Lemmon Survey || — || align=right | 2.6 km || 
|-id=873 bgcolor=#d6d6d6
| 469873 ||  || — || October 22, 2005 || Kitt Peak || Spacewatch || — || align=right | 2.7 km || 
|-id=874 bgcolor=#d6d6d6
| 469874 ||  || — || October 22, 2005 || Kitt Peak || Spacewatch || — || align=right | 2.6 km || 
|-id=875 bgcolor=#E9E9E9
| 469875 ||  || — || October 26, 2005 || Kitt Peak || Spacewatch || — || align=right data-sort-value="0.80" | 800 m || 
|-id=876 bgcolor=#d6d6d6
| 469876 ||  || — || October 24, 2005 || Kitt Peak || Spacewatch || — || align=right | 3.5 km || 
|-id=877 bgcolor=#d6d6d6
| 469877 ||  || — || October 24, 2005 || Kitt Peak || Spacewatch || EOS || align=right | 1.9 km || 
|-id=878 bgcolor=#fefefe
| 469878 ||  || — || October 27, 2005 || Kitt Peak || Spacewatch || — || align=right data-sort-value="0.70" | 700 m || 
|-id=879 bgcolor=#fefefe
| 469879 ||  || — || October 27, 2005 || Kitt Peak || Spacewatch || — || align=right data-sort-value="0.73" | 730 m || 
|-id=880 bgcolor=#fefefe
| 469880 ||  || — || October 25, 2005 || Kitt Peak || Spacewatch || NYS || align=right data-sort-value="0.72" | 720 m || 
|-id=881 bgcolor=#fefefe
| 469881 ||  || — || October 23, 2005 || Palomar || NEAT || — || align=right data-sort-value="0.75" | 750 m || 
|-id=882 bgcolor=#d6d6d6
| 469882 ||  || — || October 26, 2005 || Kitt Peak || Spacewatch || — || align=right | 2.7 km || 
|-id=883 bgcolor=#fefefe
| 469883 ||  || — || October 28, 2005 || Catalina || CSS || — || align=right data-sort-value="0.75" | 750 m || 
|-id=884 bgcolor=#d6d6d6
| 469884 ||  || — || September 29, 2005 || Catalina || CSS || TIR || align=right | 2.9 km || 
|-id=885 bgcolor=#d6d6d6
| 469885 ||  || — || September 13, 2005 || Socorro || LINEAR || TIR || align=right | 3.4 km || 
|-id=886 bgcolor=#fefefe
| 469886 ||  || — || October 23, 2005 || Catalina || CSS || — || align=right data-sort-value="0.94" | 940 m || 
|-id=887 bgcolor=#fefefe
| 469887 ||  || — || October 23, 2005 || Catalina || CSS || — || align=right | 1.1 km || 
|-id=888 bgcolor=#fefefe
| 469888 ||  || — || October 20, 2005 || Palomar || NEAT || MAS || align=right data-sort-value="0.78" | 780 m || 
|-id=889 bgcolor=#d6d6d6
| 469889 ||  || — || October 25, 2005 || Apache Point || A. C. Becker || — || align=right | 3.0 km || 
|-id=890 bgcolor=#fefefe
| 469890 ||  || — || October 27, 2005 || Apache Point || A. C. Becker || NYS || align=right data-sort-value="0.63" | 630 m || 
|-id=891 bgcolor=#d6d6d6
| 469891 ||  || — || November 11, 2005 || Socorro || LINEAR || — || align=right | 4.3 km || 
|-id=892 bgcolor=#d6d6d6
| 469892 ||  || — || November 11, 2005 || Socorro || LINEAR || Tj (2.98) || align=right | 3.7 km || 
|-id=893 bgcolor=#E9E9E9
| 469893 ||  || — || November 3, 2005 || Mount Lemmon || Mount Lemmon Survey || 526 || align=right | 2.2 km || 
|-id=894 bgcolor=#fefefe
| 469894 ||  || — || November 10, 2005 || Mount Lemmon || Mount Lemmon Survey || — || align=right | 2.6 km || 
|-id=895 bgcolor=#fefefe
| 469895 ||  || — || November 1, 2005 || Apache Point || A. C. Becker || — || align=right data-sort-value="0.76" | 760 m || 
|-id=896 bgcolor=#FFC2E0
| 469896 ||  || — || November 21, 2005 || Socorro || LINEAR || APOPHAcritical || align=right data-sort-value="0.26" | 260 m || 
|-id=897 bgcolor=#E9E9E9
| 469897 ||  || — || November 25, 2005 || Mount Lemmon || Mount Lemmon Survey || — || align=right | 2.0 km || 
|-id=898 bgcolor=#fefefe
| 469898 ||  || — || November 21, 2005 || Kitt Peak || Spacewatch || — || align=right | 2.7 km || 
|-id=899 bgcolor=#fefefe
| 469899 ||  || — || November 25, 2005 || Mount Lemmon || Mount Lemmon Survey || — || align=right data-sort-value="0.80" | 800 m || 
|-id=900 bgcolor=#E9E9E9
| 469900 ||  || — || November 25, 2005 || Kitt Peak || Spacewatch || EUN || align=right | 1.4 km || 
|}

469901–470000 

|-bgcolor=#fefefe
| 469901 ||  || — || October 23, 2005 || Catalina || CSS || — || align=right data-sort-value="0.83" | 830 m || 
|-id=902 bgcolor=#fefefe
| 469902 ||  || — || November 28, 2005 || Mount Lemmon || Mount Lemmon Survey || — || align=right data-sort-value="0.80" | 800 m || 
|-id=903 bgcolor=#d6d6d6
| 469903 ||  || — || September 25, 2005 || Kitt Peak || Spacewatch || — || align=right | 3.1 km || 
|-id=904 bgcolor=#fefefe
| 469904 ||  || — || November 29, 2005 || Kitt Peak || Spacewatch || — || align=right data-sort-value="0.85" | 850 m || 
|-id=905 bgcolor=#d6d6d6
| 469905 ||  || — || November 30, 2005 || Kitt Peak || Spacewatch || EOS || align=right | 1.7 km || 
|-id=906 bgcolor=#fefefe
| 469906 ||  || — || November 22, 2005 || Catalina || CSS || — || align=right data-sort-value="0.97" | 970 m || 
|-id=907 bgcolor=#E9E9E9
| 469907 ||  || — || December 1, 2005 || Kitt Peak || Spacewatch || — || align=right | 1.1 km || 
|-id=908 bgcolor=#fefefe
| 469908 ||  || — || November 10, 2005 || Mount Lemmon || Mount Lemmon Survey || — || align=right data-sort-value="0.82" | 820 m || 
|-id=909 bgcolor=#E9E9E9
| 469909 ||  || — || December 24, 2005 || Kitt Peak || Spacewatch || EUN || align=right | 1.2 km || 
|-id=910 bgcolor=#E9E9E9
| 469910 ||  || — || December 24, 2005 || Kitt Peak || Spacewatch || — || align=right data-sort-value="0.81" | 810 m || 
|-id=911 bgcolor=#E9E9E9
| 469911 ||  || — || December 26, 2005 || Mount Lemmon || Mount Lemmon Survey || — || align=right data-sort-value="0.96" | 960 m || 
|-id=912 bgcolor=#E9E9E9
| 469912 ||  || — || December 24, 2005 || Kitt Peak || Spacewatch || — || align=right | 2.5 km || 
|-id=913 bgcolor=#E9E9E9
| 469913 ||  || — || December 25, 2005 || Kitt Peak || Spacewatch || — || align=right | 1.3 km || 
|-id=914 bgcolor=#E9E9E9
| 469914 ||  || — || December 25, 2005 || Mount Lemmon || Mount Lemmon Survey || — || align=right | 1.8 km || 
|-id=915 bgcolor=#E9E9E9
| 469915 ||  || — || December 26, 2005 || Kitt Peak || Spacewatch || — || align=right | 1.0 km || 
|-id=916 bgcolor=#E9E9E9
| 469916 ||  || — || November 30, 2005 || Mount Lemmon || Mount Lemmon Survey || (5) || align=right data-sort-value="0.92" | 920 m || 
|-id=917 bgcolor=#E9E9E9
| 469917 ||  || — || December 25, 2005 || Mount Lemmon || Mount Lemmon Survey || — || align=right | 1.5 km || 
|-id=918 bgcolor=#E9E9E9
| 469918 ||  || — || December 4, 2005 || Mount Lemmon || Mount Lemmon Survey || — || align=right | 1.5 km || 
|-id=919 bgcolor=#E9E9E9
| 469919 ||  || — || December 27, 2005 || Kitt Peak || Spacewatch || — || align=right data-sort-value="0.89" | 890 m || 
|-id=920 bgcolor=#E9E9E9
| 469920 ||  || — || October 29, 2005 || Mount Lemmon || Mount Lemmon Survey || 526 || align=right | 2.3 km || 
|-id=921 bgcolor=#E9E9E9
| 469921 ||  || — || December 31, 2005 || Kitt Peak || Spacewatch || KRM || align=right | 2.3 km || 
|-id=922 bgcolor=#E9E9E9
| 469922 ||  || — || December 25, 2005 || Kitt Peak || Spacewatch || critical || align=right | 1.8 km || 
|-id=923 bgcolor=#E9E9E9
| 469923 ||  || — || December 30, 2005 || Kitt Peak || Spacewatch || — || align=right | 1.3 km || 
|-id=924 bgcolor=#E9E9E9
| 469924 ||  || — || December 30, 2005 || Kitt Peak || Spacewatch || — || align=right | 1.3 km || 
|-id=925 bgcolor=#fefefe
| 469925 ||  || — || December 24, 2005 || Catalina || CSS || H || align=right data-sort-value="0.93" | 930 m || 
|-id=926 bgcolor=#E9E9E9
| 469926 ||  || — || December 25, 2005 || Kitt Peak || Spacewatch || — || align=right | 1.7 km || 
|-id=927 bgcolor=#E9E9E9
| 469927 ||  || — || December 26, 2005 || Mount Lemmon || Mount Lemmon Survey || — || align=right | 1.7 km || 
|-id=928 bgcolor=#E9E9E9
| 469928 ||  || — || December 28, 2005 || Mount Lemmon || Mount Lemmon Survey || — || align=right | 1.8 km || 
|-id=929 bgcolor=#FFC2E0
| 469929 ||  || — || January 8, 2006 || Mount Lemmon || Mount Lemmon Survey || APOcritical || align=right data-sort-value="0.22" | 220 m || 
|-id=930 bgcolor=#fefefe
| 469930 ||  || — || January 2, 2006 || Mount Lemmon || Mount Lemmon Survey || — || align=right data-sort-value="0.65" | 650 m || 
|-id=931 bgcolor=#E9E9E9
| 469931 ||  || — || January 6, 2006 || Kitt Peak || Spacewatch || EUN || align=right | 1.2 km || 
|-id=932 bgcolor=#E9E9E9
| 469932 ||  || — || January 5, 2006 || Kitt Peak || Spacewatch || — || align=right data-sort-value="0.89" | 890 m || 
|-id=933 bgcolor=#E9E9E9
| 469933 ||  || — || December 1, 2005 || Kitt Peak || Spacewatch || — || align=right data-sort-value="0.91" | 910 m || 
|-id=934 bgcolor=#d6d6d6
| 469934 ||  || — || January 5, 2006 || Kitt Peak || Spacewatch || 7:4 || align=right | 3.6 km || 
|-id=935 bgcolor=#E9E9E9
| 469935 ||  || — || December 28, 2005 || Kitt Peak || Spacewatch || — || align=right data-sort-value="0.85" | 850 m || 
|-id=936 bgcolor=#E9E9E9
| 469936 ||  || — || January 4, 2006 || Kitt Peak || Spacewatch || — || align=right data-sort-value="0.79" | 790 m || 
|-id=937 bgcolor=#E9E9E9
| 469937 ||  || — || January 8, 2006 || Kitt Peak || Spacewatch || MAR || align=right data-sort-value="0.69" | 690 m || 
|-id=938 bgcolor=#E9E9E9
| 469938 ||  || — || January 21, 2006 || Kitt Peak || Spacewatch || — || align=right | 2.0 km || 
|-id=939 bgcolor=#E9E9E9
| 469939 ||  || — || January 21, 2006 || Mount Lemmon || Mount Lemmon Survey || — || align=right data-sort-value="0.90" | 900 m || 
|-id=940 bgcolor=#E9E9E9
| 469940 ||  || — || January 2, 2006 || Catalina || CSS || EUN || align=right | 1.1 km || 
|-id=941 bgcolor=#E9E9E9
| 469941 ||  || — || January 23, 2006 || Socorro || LINEAR || — || align=right | 2.9 km || 
|-id=942 bgcolor=#E9E9E9
| 469942 ||  || — || January 10, 2006 || Mount Lemmon || Mount Lemmon Survey || — || align=right | 1.5 km || 
|-id=943 bgcolor=#E9E9E9
| 469943 ||  || — || January 23, 2006 || Kitt Peak || Spacewatch || — || align=right | 2.4 km || 
|-id=944 bgcolor=#E9E9E9
| 469944 ||  || — || January 25, 2006 || Kitt Peak || Spacewatch || EUN || align=right | 1.4 km || 
|-id=945 bgcolor=#E9E9E9
| 469945 ||  || — || January 26, 2006 || Kitt Peak || Spacewatch || RAF || align=right | 1.1 km || 
|-id=946 bgcolor=#E9E9E9
| 469946 ||  || — || January 23, 2006 || Mount Lemmon || Mount Lemmon Survey || — || align=right | 1.1 km || 
|-id=947 bgcolor=#E9E9E9
| 469947 ||  || — || January 25, 2006 || Kitt Peak || Spacewatch || — || align=right data-sort-value="0.79" | 790 m || 
|-id=948 bgcolor=#E9E9E9
| 469948 ||  || — || January 25, 2006 || Kitt Peak || Spacewatch || — || align=right data-sort-value="0.69" | 690 m || 
|-id=949 bgcolor=#E9E9E9
| 469949 ||  || — || January 25, 2006 || Kitt Peak || Spacewatch || — || align=right | 1.3 km || 
|-id=950 bgcolor=#E9E9E9
| 469950 ||  || — || January 26, 2006 || Mount Lemmon || Mount Lemmon Survey || — || align=right data-sort-value="0.79" | 790 m || 
|-id=951 bgcolor=#E9E9E9
| 469951 ||  || — || January 23, 2006 || Socorro || LINEAR || — || align=right | 2.2 km || 
|-id=952 bgcolor=#E9E9E9
| 469952 ||  || — || January 25, 2006 || Kitt Peak || Spacewatch || — || align=right | 2.5 km || 
|-id=953 bgcolor=#E9E9E9
| 469953 ||  || — || January 9, 2006 || Kitt Peak || Spacewatch || MAR || align=right data-sort-value="0.78" | 780 m || 
|-id=954 bgcolor=#E9E9E9
| 469954 ||  || — || January 27, 2006 || Kitt Peak || Spacewatch || — || align=right | 2.0 km || 
|-id=955 bgcolor=#E9E9E9
| 469955 ||  || — || January 7, 2006 || Kitt Peak || Spacewatch || — || align=right | 1.0 km || 
|-id=956 bgcolor=#E9E9E9
| 469956 ||  || — || January 31, 2006 || Kitt Peak || Spacewatch || — || align=right | 1.1 km || 
|-id=957 bgcolor=#E9E9E9
| 469957 ||  || — || January 25, 2006 || Kitt Peak || Spacewatch || JUN || align=right | 1.0 km || 
|-id=958 bgcolor=#E9E9E9
| 469958 ||  || — || February 1, 2006 || Catalina || CSS || MAR || align=right | 1.3 km || 
|-id=959 bgcolor=#E9E9E9
| 469959 ||  || — || November 25, 2005 || Kitt Peak || Spacewatch || — || align=right data-sort-value="0.94" | 940 m || 
|-id=960 bgcolor=#E9E9E9
| 469960 ||  || — || February 20, 2006 || Catalina || CSS || — || align=right | 2.0 km || 
|-id=961 bgcolor=#E9E9E9
| 469961 ||  || — || February 20, 2006 || Kitt Peak || Spacewatch || — || align=right | 2.8 km || 
|-id=962 bgcolor=#E9E9E9
| 469962 ||  || — || February 20, 2006 || Kitt Peak || Spacewatch || — || align=right | 1.1 km || 
|-id=963 bgcolor=#E9E9E9
| 469963 ||  || — || February 24, 2006 || Catalina || CSS || JUN || align=right | 1.2 km || 
|-id=964 bgcolor=#E9E9E9
| 469964 ||  || — || February 7, 2006 || Mount Lemmon || Mount Lemmon Survey || — || align=right | 2.0 km || 
|-id=965 bgcolor=#E9E9E9
| 469965 ||  || — || February 24, 2006 || Kitt Peak || Spacewatch || EUN || align=right | 1.3 km || 
|-id=966 bgcolor=#E9E9E9
| 469966 ||  || — || February 24, 2006 || Kitt Peak || Spacewatch || — || align=right | 1.3 km || 
|-id=967 bgcolor=#E9E9E9
| 469967 ||  || — || February 24, 2006 || Kitt Peak || Spacewatch || — || align=right | 1.5 km || 
|-id=968 bgcolor=#d6d6d6
| 469968 ||  || — || February 2, 2006 || Kitt Peak || Spacewatch || critical || align=right | 2.9 km || 
|-id=969 bgcolor=#E9E9E9
| 469969 ||  || — || February 21, 2006 || Catalina || CSS || JUN || align=right | 1.1 km || 
|-id=970 bgcolor=#E9E9E9
| 469970 ||  || — || February 25, 2006 || Mount Lemmon || Mount Lemmon Survey || EUN || align=right | 1.4 km || 
|-id=971 bgcolor=#E9E9E9
| 469971 ||  || — || February 27, 2006 || Kitt Peak || Spacewatch || — || align=right | 1.5 km || 
|-id=972 bgcolor=#E9E9E9
| 469972 ||  || — || February 28, 2006 || Mount Lemmon || Mount Lemmon Survey || — || align=right data-sort-value="0.84" | 840 m || 
|-id=973 bgcolor=#E9E9E9
| 469973 ||  || — || January 26, 2006 || Kitt Peak || Spacewatch || — || align=right | 1.7 km || 
|-id=974 bgcolor=#E9E9E9
| 469974 ||  || — || February 27, 2006 || Kitt Peak || Spacewatch || EUN || align=right | 1.2 km || 
|-id=975 bgcolor=#E9E9E9
| 469975 ||  || — || February 20, 2006 || Kitt Peak || Spacewatch || — || align=right | 1.3 km || 
|-id=976 bgcolor=#E9E9E9
| 469976 ||  || — || March 2, 2006 || Kitt Peak || Spacewatch || — || align=right | 1.4 km || 
|-id=977 bgcolor=#E9E9E9
| 469977 ||  || — || March 5, 2006 || Kitt Peak || Spacewatch || — || align=right | 1.2 km || 
|-id=978 bgcolor=#E9E9E9
| 469978 ||  || — || March 18, 2006 || Bergisch Gladbac || W. Bickel || — || align=right | 1.2 km || 
|-id=979 bgcolor=#E9E9E9
| 469979 ||  || — || February 25, 2006 || Anderson Mesa || LONEOS || — || align=right | 2.6 km || 
|-id=980 bgcolor=#fefefe
| 469980 ||  || — || April 2, 2006 || Kitt Peak || Spacewatch || — || align=right data-sort-value="0.57" | 570 m || 
|-id=981 bgcolor=#E9E9E9
| 469981 ||  || — || March 24, 2006 || Mount Lemmon || Mount Lemmon Survey || — || align=right | 1.8 km || 
|-id=982 bgcolor=#E9E9E9
| 469982 ||  || — || April 20, 2006 || Kitt Peak || Spacewatch || — || align=right | 1.7 km || 
|-id=983 bgcolor=#E9E9E9
| 469983 ||  || — || April 21, 2006 || Catalina || CSS || — || align=right | 2.0 km || 
|-id=984 bgcolor=#E9E9E9
| 469984 ||  || — || April 21, 2006 || Kitt Peak || Spacewatch || — || align=right | 2.4 km || 
|-id=985 bgcolor=#E9E9E9
| 469985 ||  || — || April 30, 2006 || Kitt Peak || Spacewatch || — || align=right | 2.0 km || 
|-id=986 bgcolor=#E9E9E9
| 469986 ||  || — || April 30, 2006 || Kitt Peak || Spacewatch || — || align=right | 2.1 km || 
|-id=987 bgcolor=#C2E0FF
| 469987 ||  || — || April 27, 2006 || Cerro Tololo || M. W. Buie || plutino || align=right | 261 km || 
|-id=988 bgcolor=#E9E9E9
| 469988 ||  || — || April 26, 2006 || Cerro Tololo || M. W. Buie || — || align=right | 1.7 km || 
|-id=989 bgcolor=#E9E9E9
| 469989 ||  || — || May 1, 2006 || Kitt Peak || Spacewatch || — || align=right | 1.9 km || 
|-id=990 bgcolor=#E9E9E9
| 469990 ||  || — || April 24, 2006 || Kitt Peak || Spacewatch || AGN || align=right | 1.3 km || 
|-id=991 bgcolor=#E9E9E9
| 469991 ||  || — || April 8, 2006 || Kitt Peak || Spacewatch || — || align=right | 1.9 km || 
|-id=992 bgcolor=#E9E9E9
| 469992 ||  || — || May 4, 2006 || Kitt Peak || Spacewatch || — || align=right | 1.6 km || 
|-id=993 bgcolor=#E9E9E9
| 469993 ||  || — || May 20, 2006 || Kitt Peak || Spacewatch || EUN || align=right | 1.2 km || 
|-id=994 bgcolor=#E9E9E9
| 469994 ||  || — || May 1, 2006 || Catalina || CSS || — || align=right | 2.1 km || 
|-id=995 bgcolor=#E9E9E9
| 469995 ||  || — || March 2, 2006 || Kitt Peak || Spacewatch || — || align=right | 2.5 km || 
|-id=996 bgcolor=#E9E9E9
| 469996 ||  || — || May 20, 2006 || Kitt Peak || Spacewatch || — || align=right | 1.6 km || 
|-id=997 bgcolor=#E9E9E9
| 469997 ||  || — || May 21, 2006 || Kitt Peak || Spacewatch || — || align=right | 2.3 km || 
|-id=998 bgcolor=#fefefe
| 469998 ||  || — || May 9, 2006 || Mount Lemmon || Mount Lemmon Survey || — || align=right data-sort-value="0.57" | 570 m || 
|-id=999 bgcolor=#fefefe
| 469999 ||  || — || May 22, 2006 || Kitt Peak || Spacewatch || — || align=right data-sort-value="0.62" | 620 m || 
|-id=000 bgcolor=#fefefe
| 470000 ||  || — || May 23, 2006 || Kitt Peak || Spacewatch || — || align=right data-sort-value="0.53" | 530 m || 
|}

References

External links 
 Discovery Circumstances: Numbered Minor Planets (465001)–(470000) (IAU Minor Planet Center)

0469